= Ciénega, Boyacá =

Ciénega
- Municipality and town
- Flag

- Location of the municipality and town of Ciénega in the Boyacá department of Colombia
- Coordinates: 5°24′32″N 73°17′46″W
- Country: Colombia
- Department: Boyacá Department
- Province: Márquez Province
- Founded: 22 October 1818
- Founder: José Cayetano Vasquez

Government
  - Mayor: Ramiro Fonseca Cruz (2020–2023)

Area
  - Municipality and town: 73 km^{2} (28 sq mi)
  - Urban: 15 km^{2} (5.8 sq mi)
- Elevation: 2,460 m (8,070 ft)

Population (2015)
  - Municipality and town: 4,754
  - Density: 65/km^{2} (170/sq mi)
  - Urban: 1,332
- Time zone: UTC-5 (Colombia Standard Time)
- Website: Official website

Ciénega (Spanish pronunciation: [ˈsjeneɣa]) is a municipality in the Márquez Province, part of Boyacá Department, Colombia. The urban centre of Ciénega is situated on the Altiplano Cundiboyacense at a distance of 27 kilometres (17 mi) from the department capital Tunja at an elevation of 2,460 metres (8,070 ft). The elevation ranges within the municipality from 2,200 metres (7,200 ft) to 3,400 metres (11,200 ft). The municipality borders Viracachá and Soracá in the north, Rondón in the east and south and Ramiriquí in the south and west.

== Etymology ==
The name Ciénega comes from Chibcha and means "Place of water".

== History ==
The area around Ciénega in the times before the Spanish conquest was part of the Muisca Confederation, a loose confederation of different rulers of the Muisca. Ciénega was ruled by the zaque based in Hunza. On his way to the legendary El Dorado, conquistador Gonzalo Jiménez de Quesada passed through Ciénega.

Modern Ciénega was founded on October 22, 1818 by José Cayetano Vasquez, son of the owner of the main hacienda in the village.

== Economy ==
Main economical activities of Ciénega are livestock farming (66 %) and agriculture (31 %). Among the agricultural products cultivated are potatoes, maize, peas and arracacha, tree tomato and uchuva.

== Born in Ciénega ==
- Jesús María Coronado Caro, bishop
- Hector Páez, professional mountainbiker
