= Chíquiza =

Coordinates: 5°36′N 73°29′W

- Municipality and town
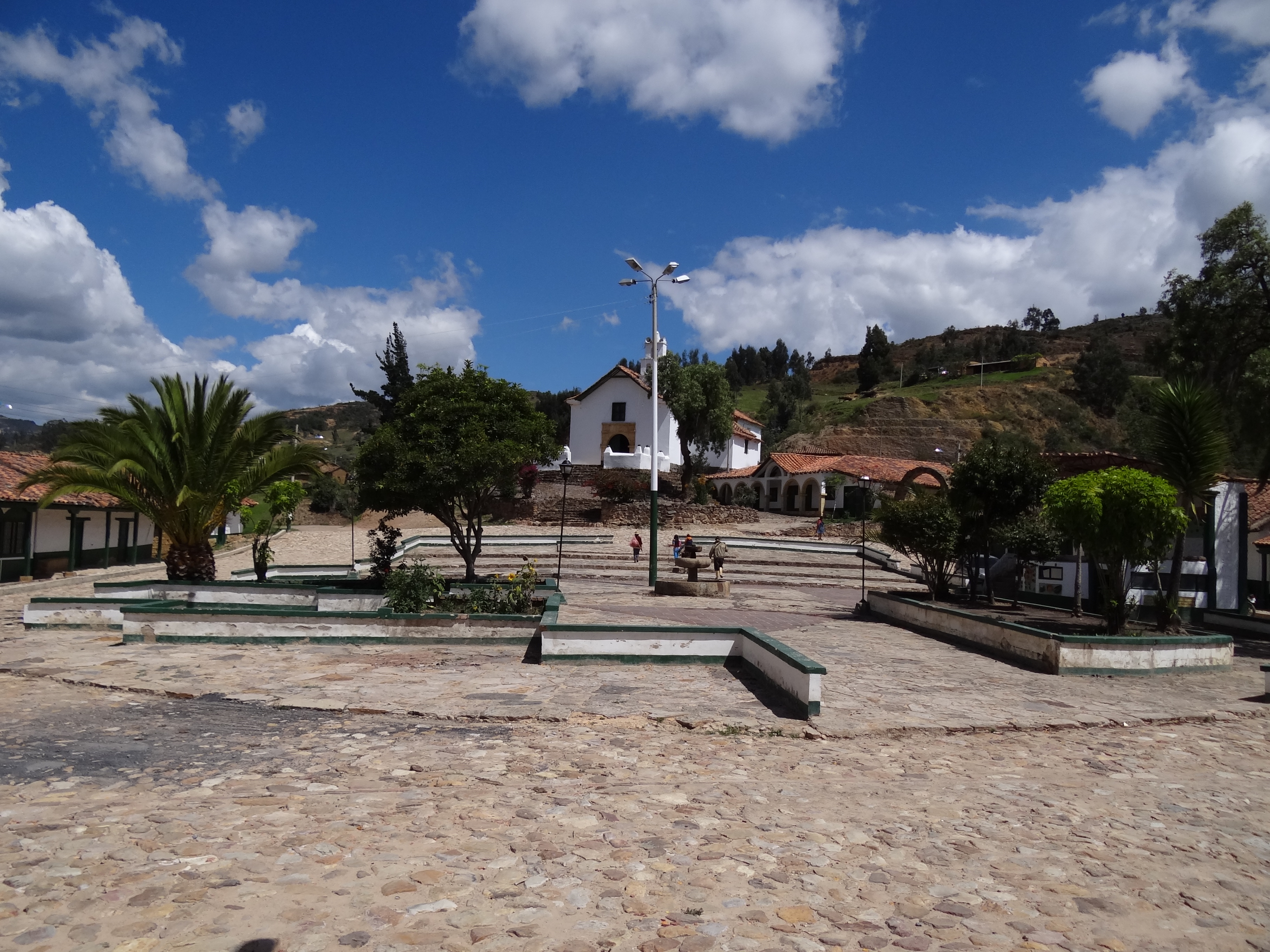
- Central square Chíquiza

- Flag

- Location of the municipality and town of Chíquiza in the Boyacá department of Colombia
- Country: Colombia
- Department: Boyacá Department
- Province: Central Boyacá Province
- Founded: 17 July 1556

Government
  - Mayor: Elkin Yamid Suárez Pacheco (2020-2023)

Area
  - Municipality and town: 119.52 km^{2} (46.15 sq mi)
  - Urban: 23.71 km^{2} (9.15 sq mi)
- Elevation: 2,900 m (9,500 ft)

Population (2015)
  - Municipality and town: 5,484
  - Density: 45.88/km^{2} (118.8/sq mi)
  - Urban: 94
- Time zone: UTC-5 (Colombia Standard Time)
- Website: Official website

Chíquiza (Spanish pronunciation: ['tʃikisa]) is a town and municipality in the Central Boyacá Province, part of the Colombian Department of Boyacá. Chíquiza was called San Pedro de Iguaque until July 17, 2003, when the name was changed to Chíquiza. The municipality is situated on the Altiplano Cundiboyacense with the urban centre at an altitude of 2,900 metres (9,500 ft) and 24 kilometres (15 mi) from the department capital Tunja. Chíquiza borders Arcabuco in the north, Sora and Sáchica in the south, Villa de Leyva in the west and Motavita in the east.

== Etymology ==
The name Chíquiza comes from Muisca and means "barren field" or "uncultivated land", linking it to an ancient Muisca legend.

== History ==
Before the Spanish conquest, Chíquiza was part of the loose Muisca Confederation and ruled by a cacique who was loyal to the zaque of Hunza. The village was important in the religion of the Muisca as it was close to the sacred Lake Iguaque; the birthplace of Bachué, mother goddess of the Muisca.

Modern Chíquiza was founded in 1556 and became a part of Tunja until 1982. In 2003 the name was changed from San Pedro de Iguaque to Chíquiza.

== Economy ==
The economy of Chíquiza is centered around agriculture and livestock farming. Main agricultural products are maize, potatoes, peas, wheat, nabo, ibia, ruba and onions.

== Gallery ==
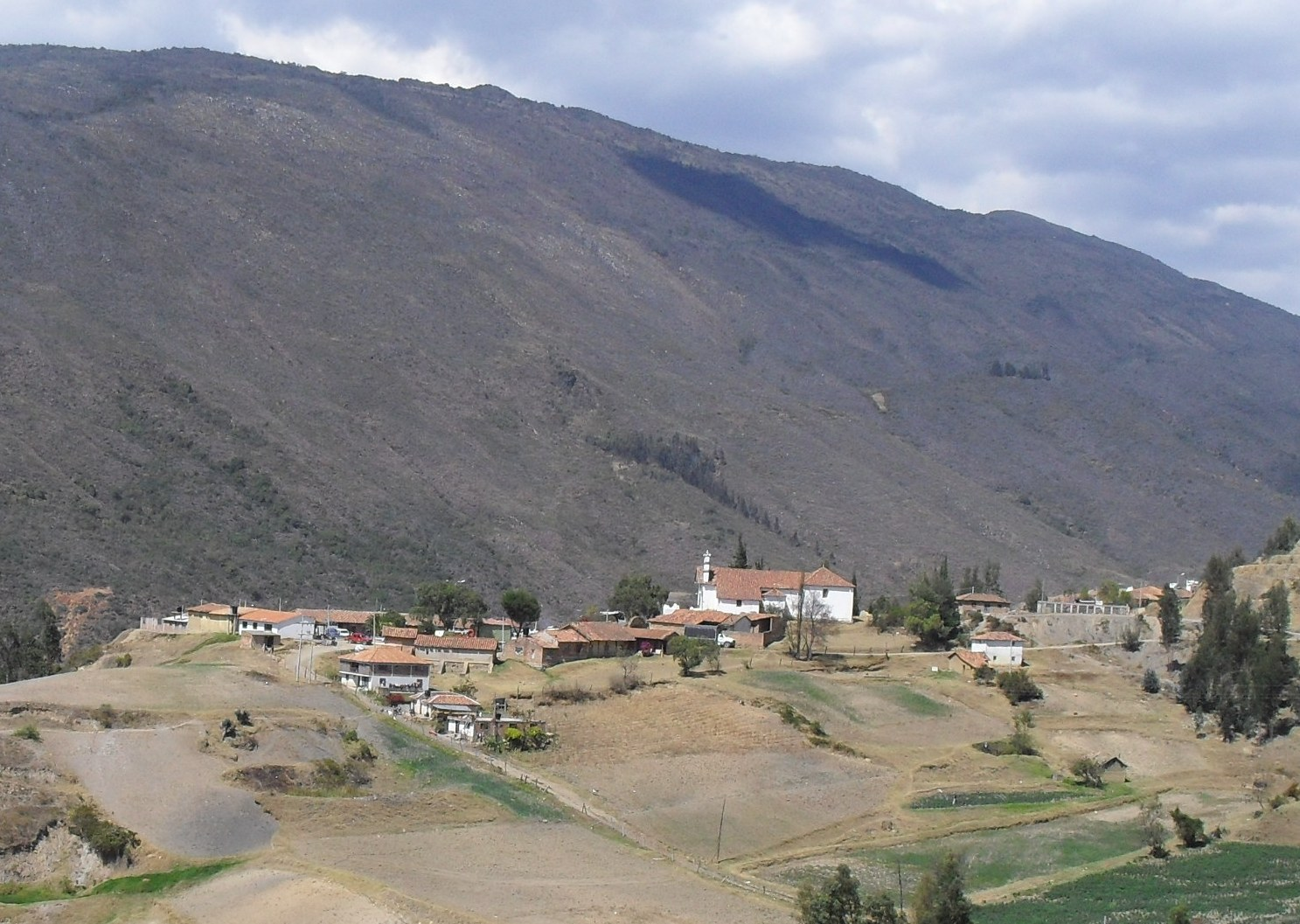
View of Chíquiza

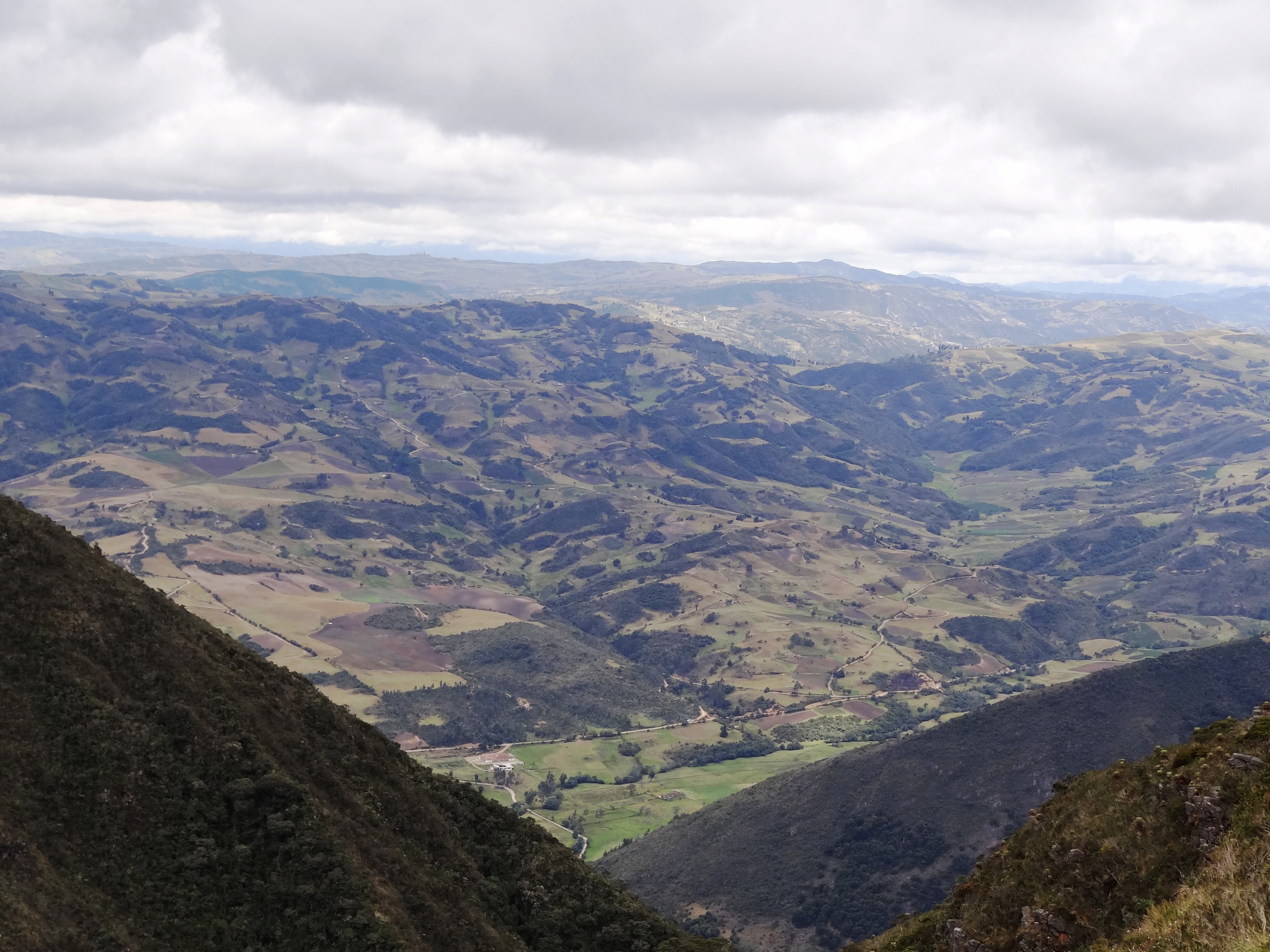
Rural area

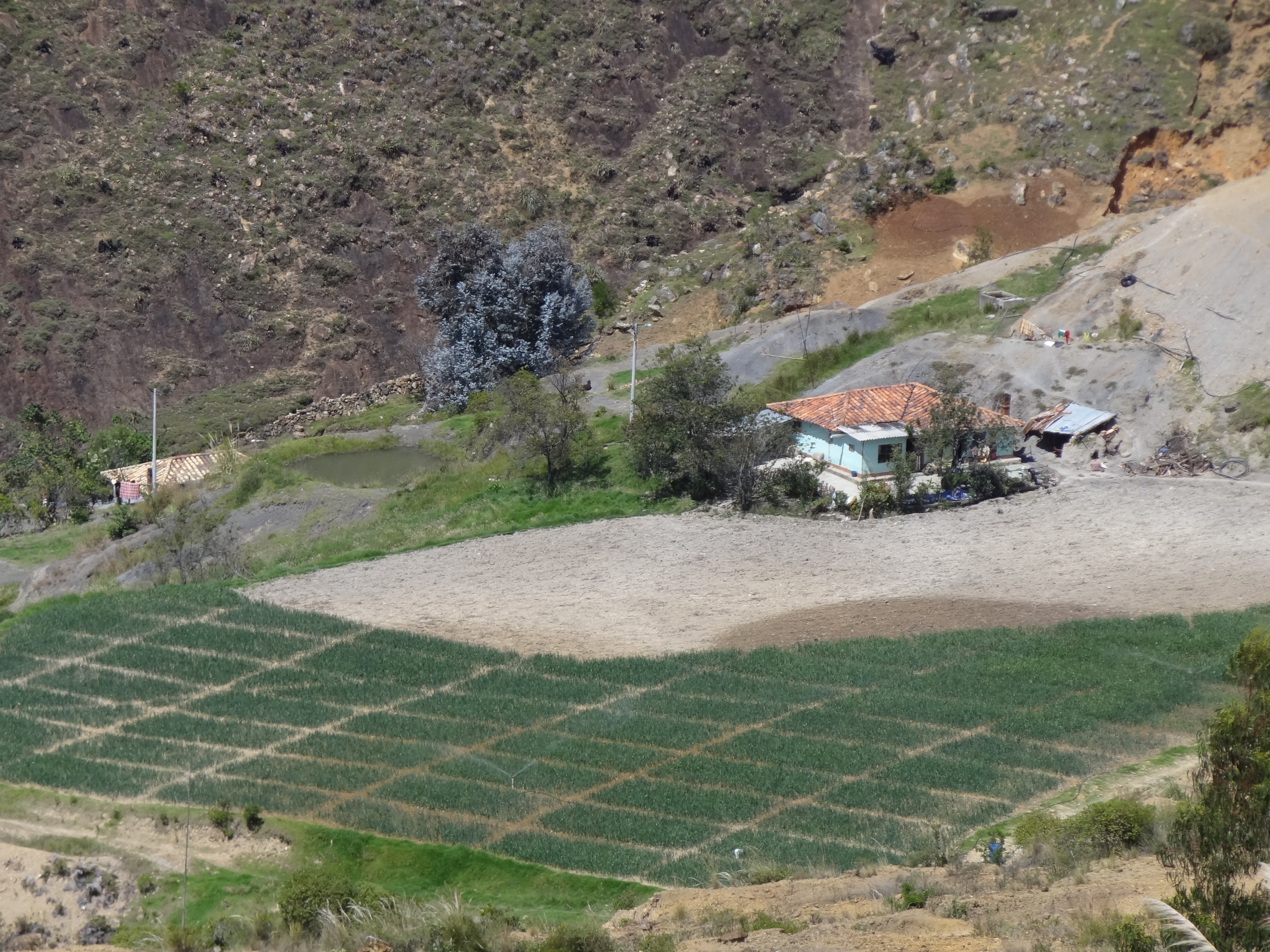
Onion fields

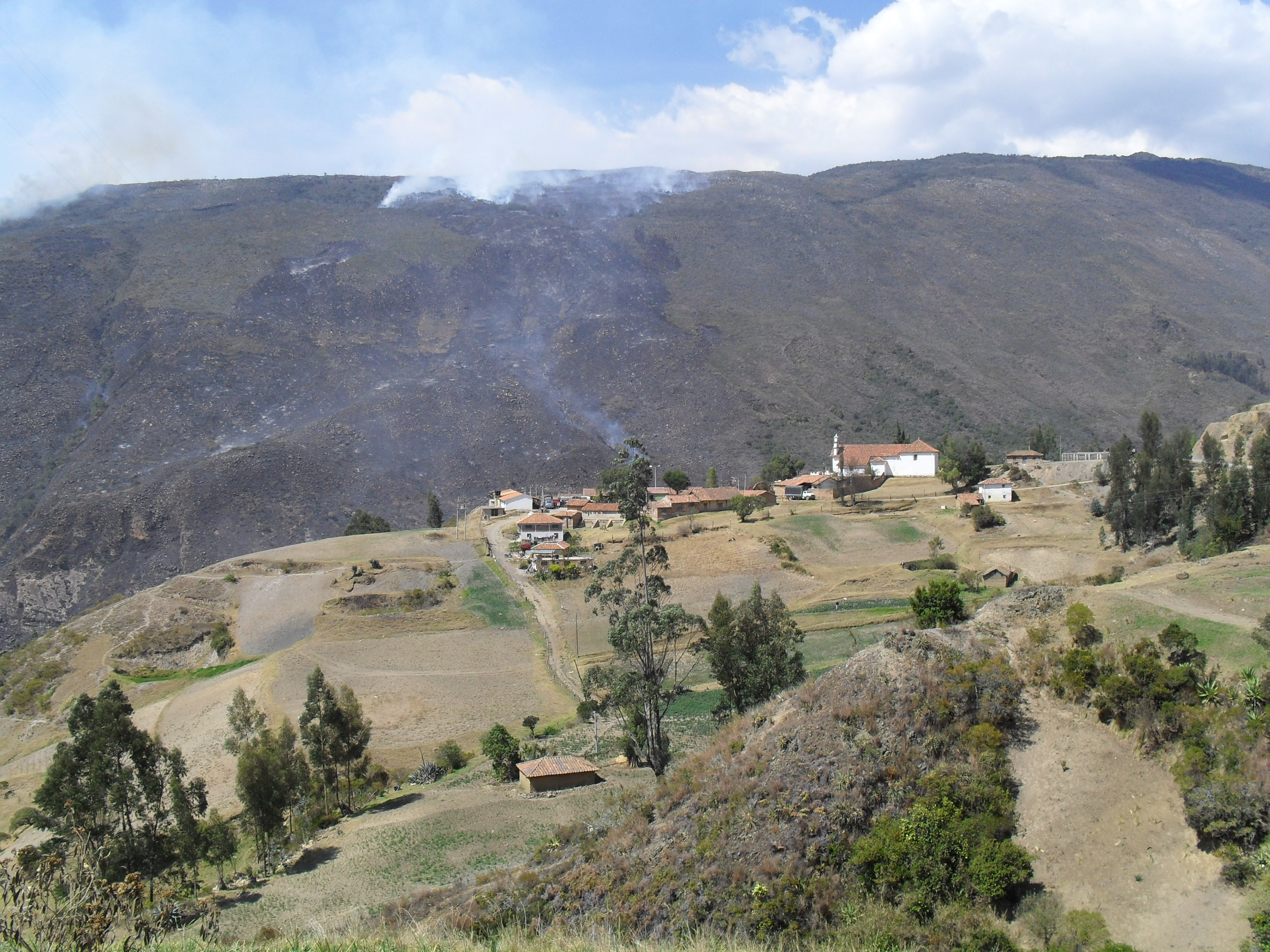
Forest fire
