= Sotaquirá =

Coordinates: 5°46′N 73°15′W

- Municipality and town
- Flag

- Location of the municipality and town of Sotaquirá in the Boyacá Department of Colombia
- Country: Colombia
- Department: Boyacá Department
- Province: Central Boyacá Province
- Founded: 20 December 1582
- Founder: Friar Arturo Cabeza de Vaca

Government
  - Mayor: Henry Santiago Suta Toca (2020-2023)

Area
  - Municipality and town: 288.65 km^{2} (111.45 sq mi)
  - Urban: 0.10 km^{2} (0.039 sq mi)
- Elevation: 2,860 m (9,380 ft)

Population (2015)
  - Municipality and town: 7,709
  - Density: 26.71/km^{2} (69.17/sq mi)
  - Urban: 716
- Time zone: UTC-5 (Colombia Standard Time)
- Website: Official website

Sotaquirá is a town and municipality in the Central Boyacá Province, part of the Colombian department of Boyacá. Sotaquirá is situated in the Eastern Ranges of the Colombian Andes with the small urban center at an altitude of 2,860 metres (9,380 ft) at 39 kilometres (24 mi) from Tunja. Sotaquirá is a highly rural municipality with 90% of the people living in rural areas and about 50% more cows than inhabitants. The municipality borders Tuta in the east, Paipa in the north, Gámbita, Santander in the west and Cómbita in the south.

== History ==
Located on the Altiplano Cundiboyacense, Sotaquirá before the Spanish conquest was inhabited by the Muisca organized in their loose Muisca Confederation. Sotaquirá was ruled by the zaque of Hunza, present-day department capital Tunja. Modern Sotaquirá was founded on December 20, 1582 by friar Arturo Cabeza de Vaca.

== Etymology ==
In the Chibcha language of the Muisca Sotaquirá means "Town of the sovereign".

== Economy ==
Main economical activities of Sotaquirá are agriculture (barley, beans, potatoes, maize, peas and fruits as peaches, pear, prunes, apples, blackberries, strawberries, curuba, tree tomatoes and feijoa), livestock and dairy farming.
