= Chivatá =

Coordinates: 5°32′N 73°16′W

- Municipality and town
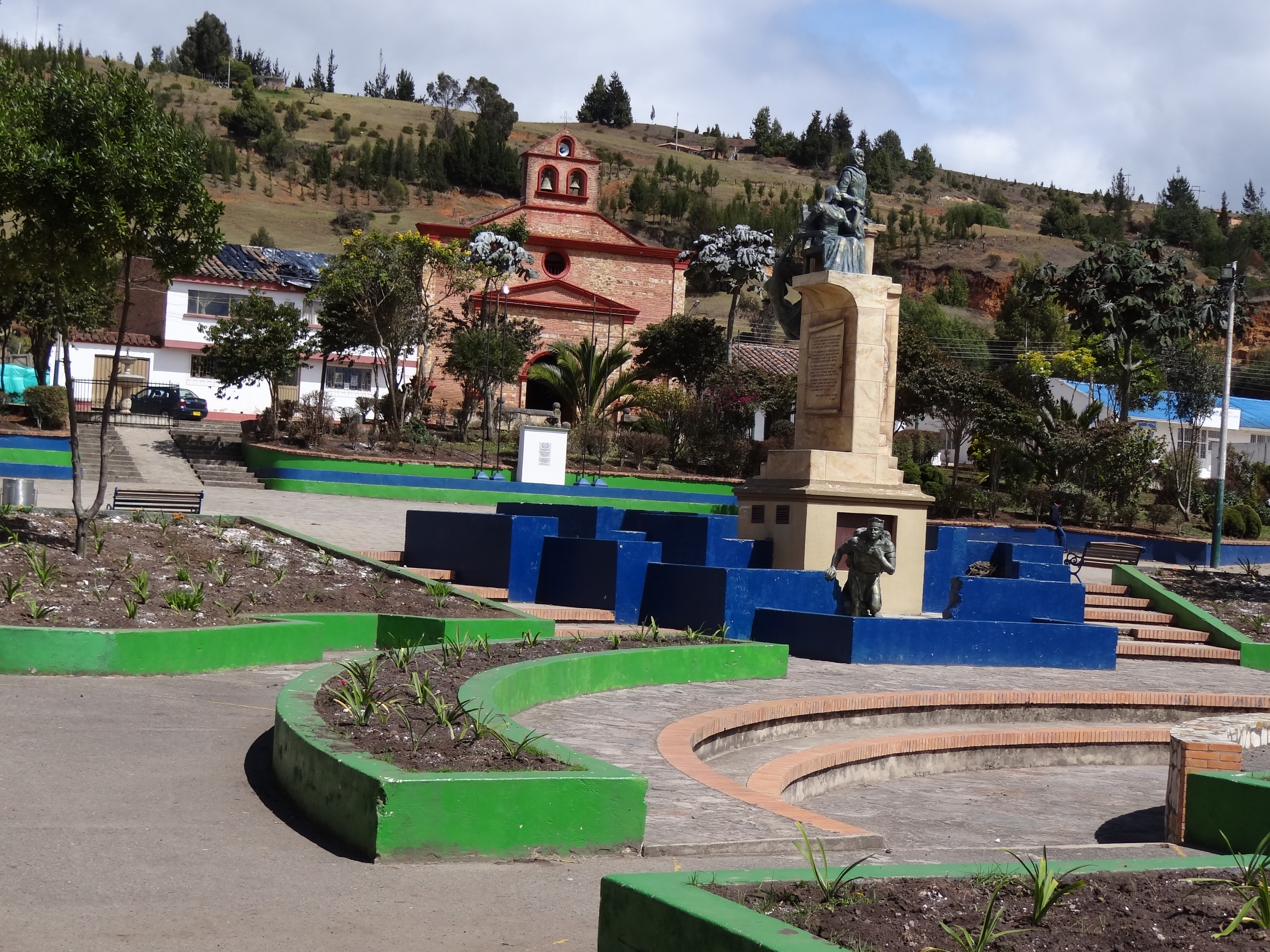
- Central square of Chivatá

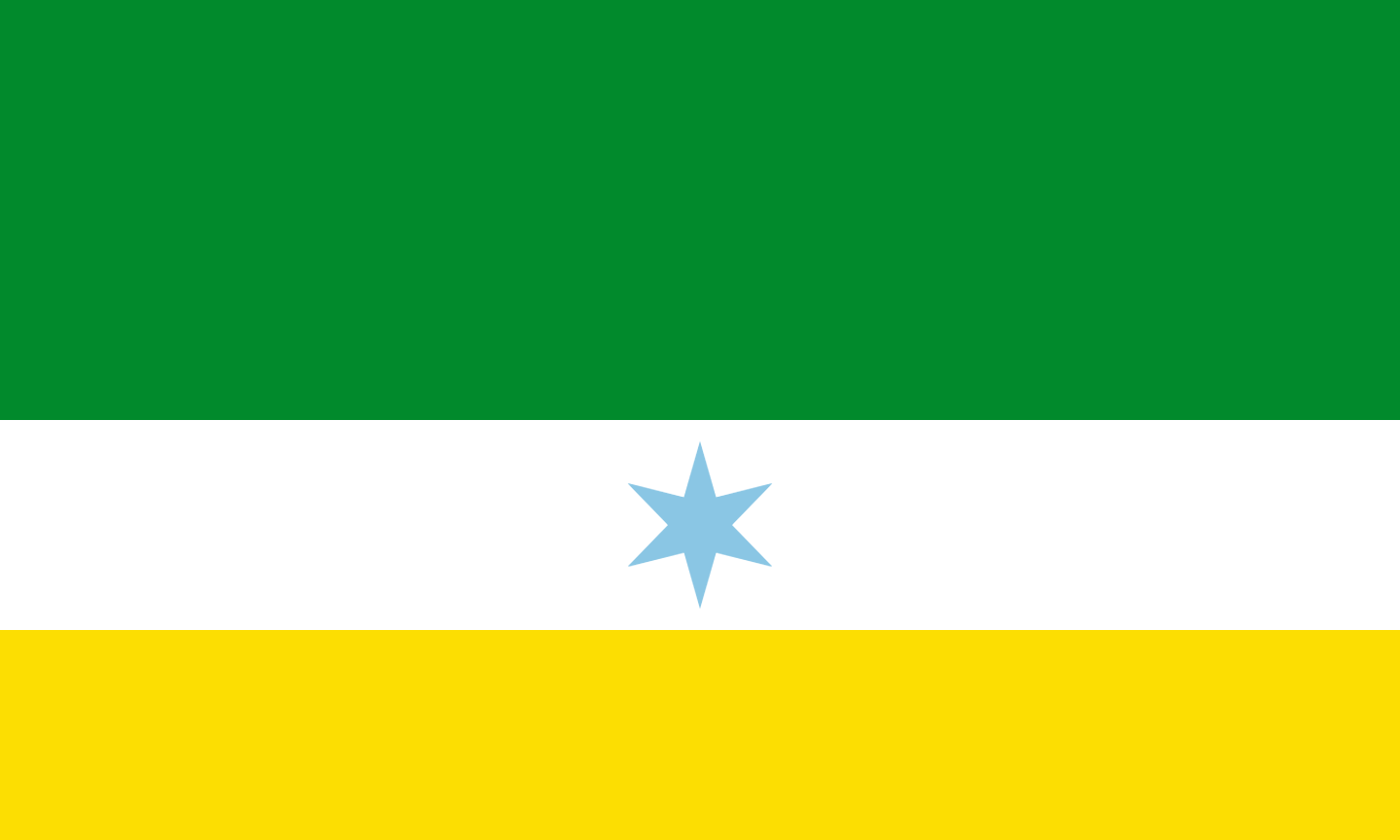
- Flag

- Location of the municipality and town of Chivatá in the Boyacá Department of Colombia
- Country: Colombia
- Department: Boyacá Department
- Province: Central Boyacá Province
- Founded: 5 March 1556

Government
  - Mayor: Rafael Antonio Fonseca Cely (2020-2023)

Area
  - Municipality and town: 56 km^{2} (22 sq mi)
  - Urban: 20 km^{2} (7.7 sq mi)
- Elevation: 2,903 m (9,524 ft)

Population (2015)
  - Municipality and town: 6,199
  - Density: 110/km^{2} (290/sq mi)
  - Urban: 2,557
- Time zone: UTC-5 (Colombia Standard Time)
- Website: Official website

Chivatá is a town and municipality in the Central Boyacá Province, part of the Colombian department of Boyacá. The urban centre is situated at an altitude of 2,903 metres (9,524 ft) on the Altiplano Cundiboyacense at 5 kilometres (3.1 mi) from the department capital Tunja. It borders Oicatá, Toca and Tuta in the north, Toca and Siachoque in the east, Siachoque and Soracá in the south and Tunja in the west.

== Etymology ==
The name Chivatá is derived from the Chibcha language of the Muisca who inhabited the central highlands of Colombia before the Spanish conquest in the 1530s. It means "Our outside farmfields".

== History ==
Chivatá was ruled by a cacique named Chipatá, loyal to the zaque of nearby Hunza before the arrival of the Spanish conquistadores. Modern Chivatá was founded on March 5, 1556.

== Gallery ==
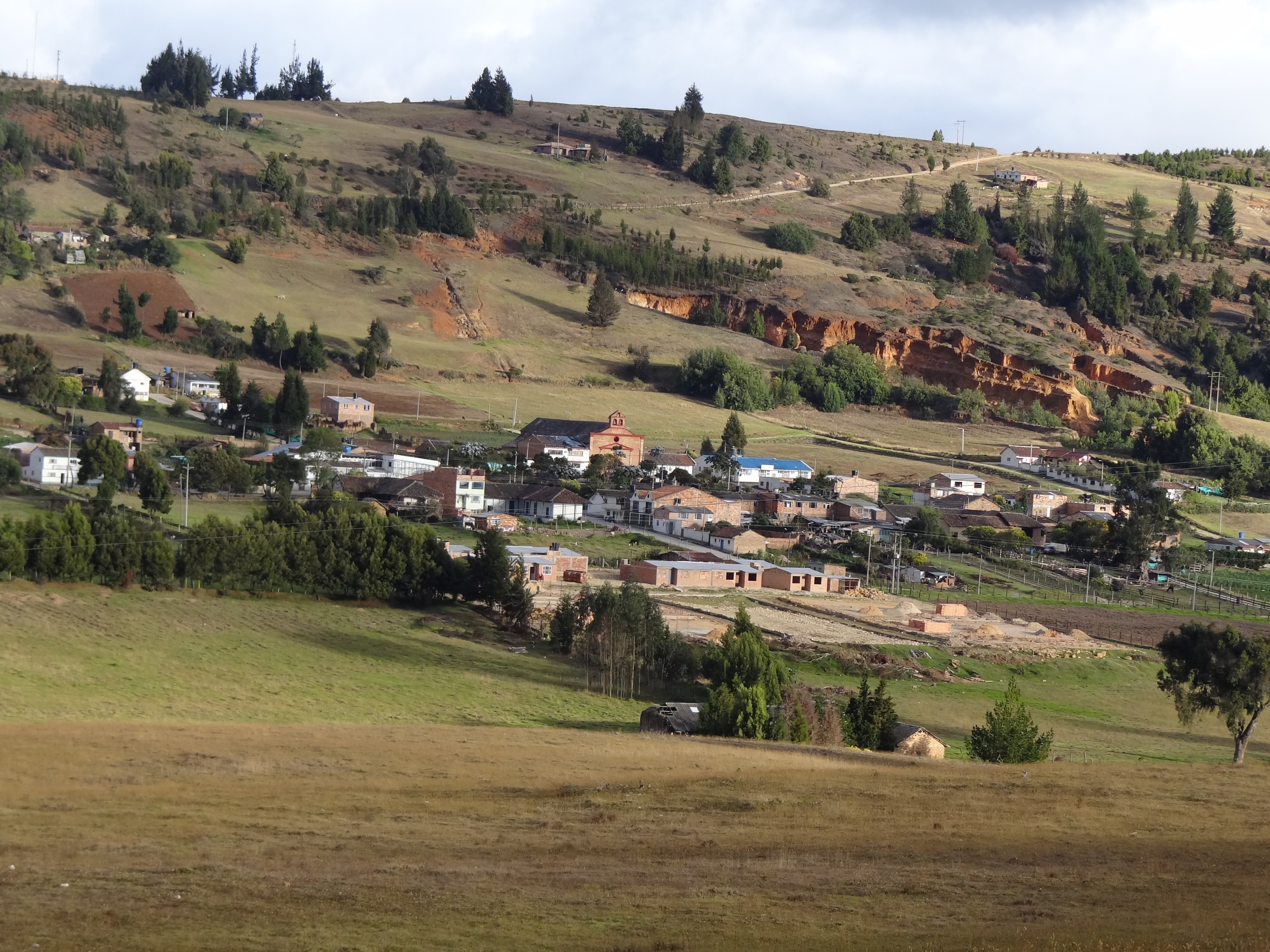
View of Chivatá

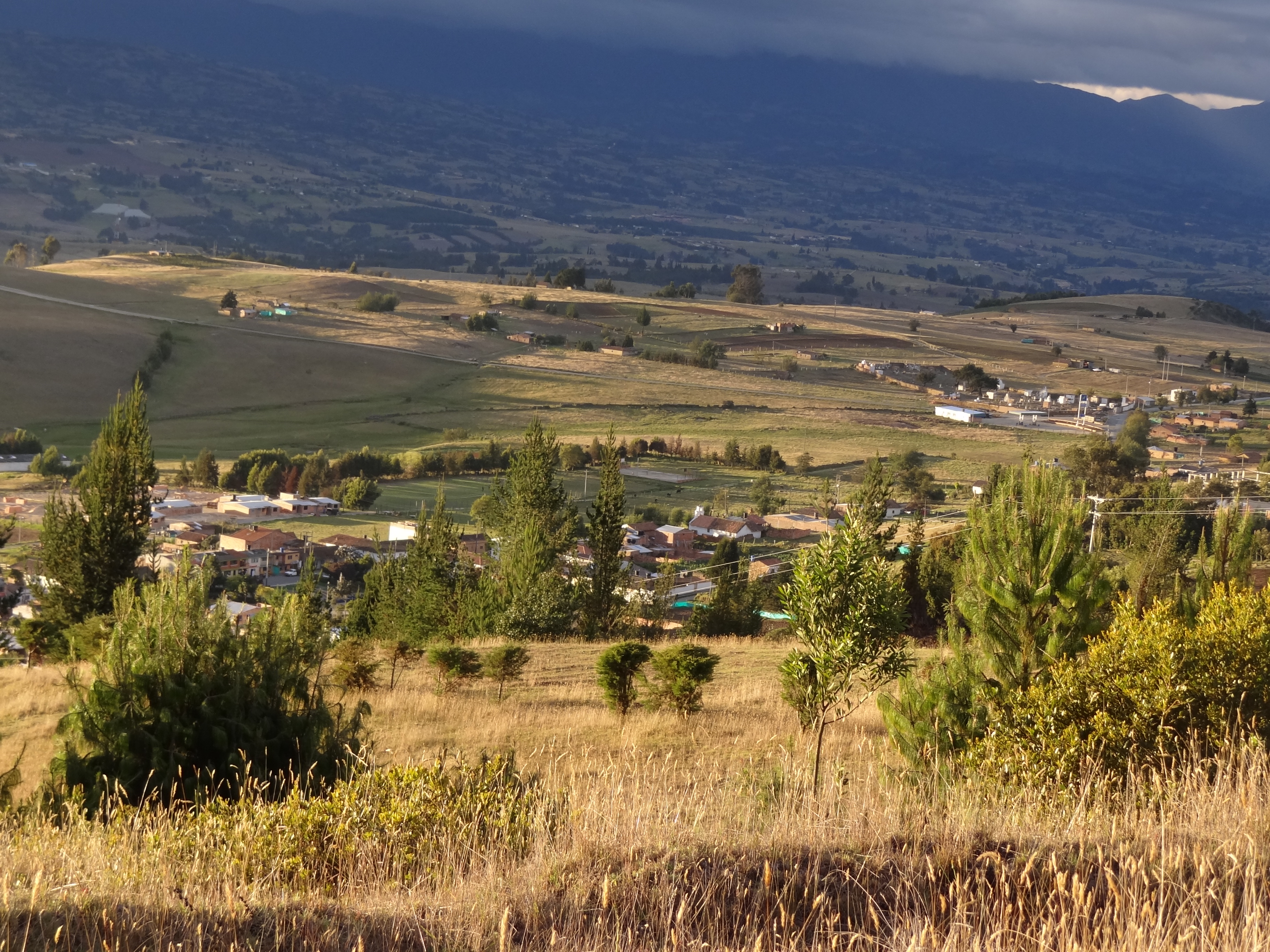
Rural area

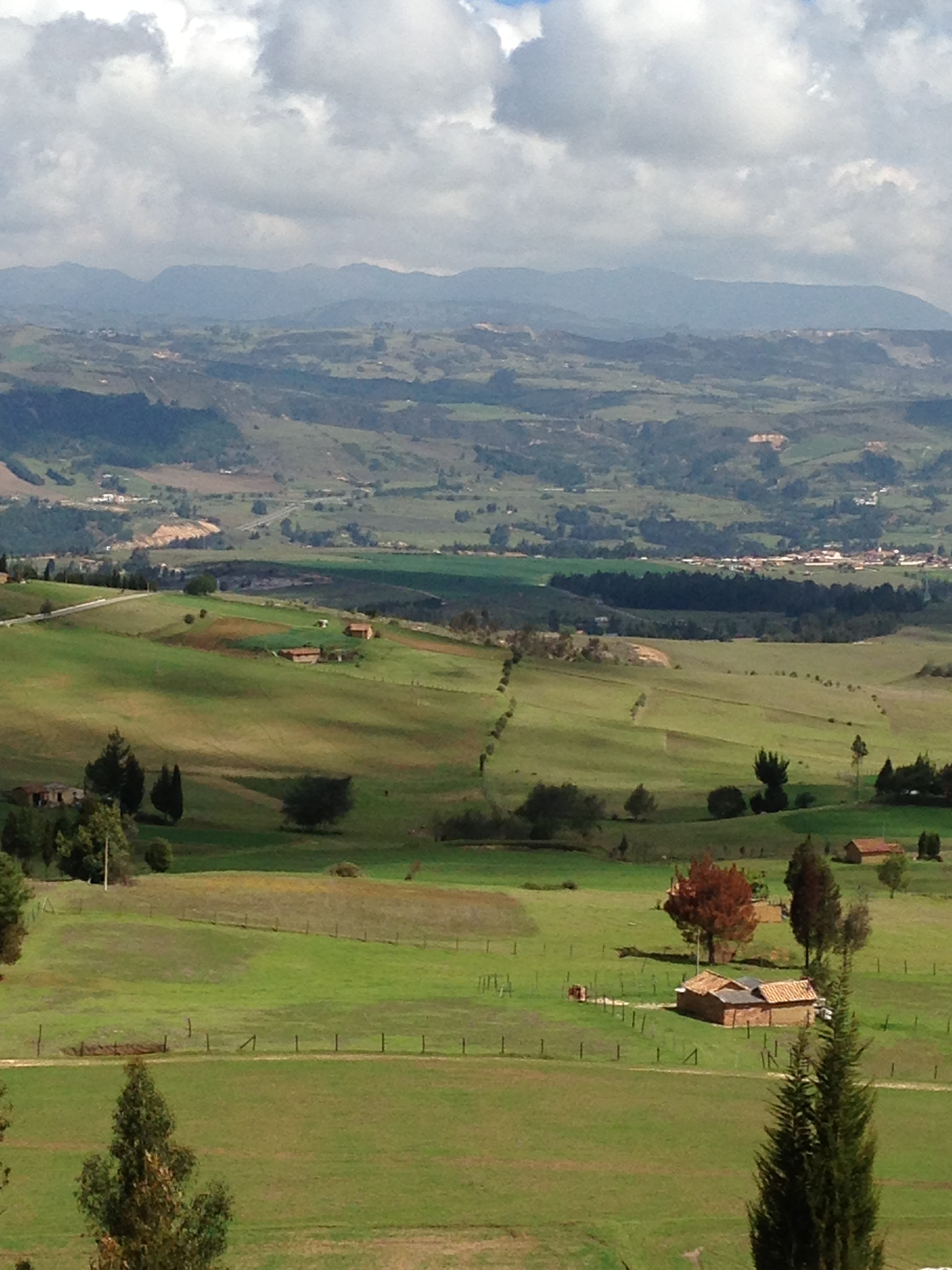
Rural area
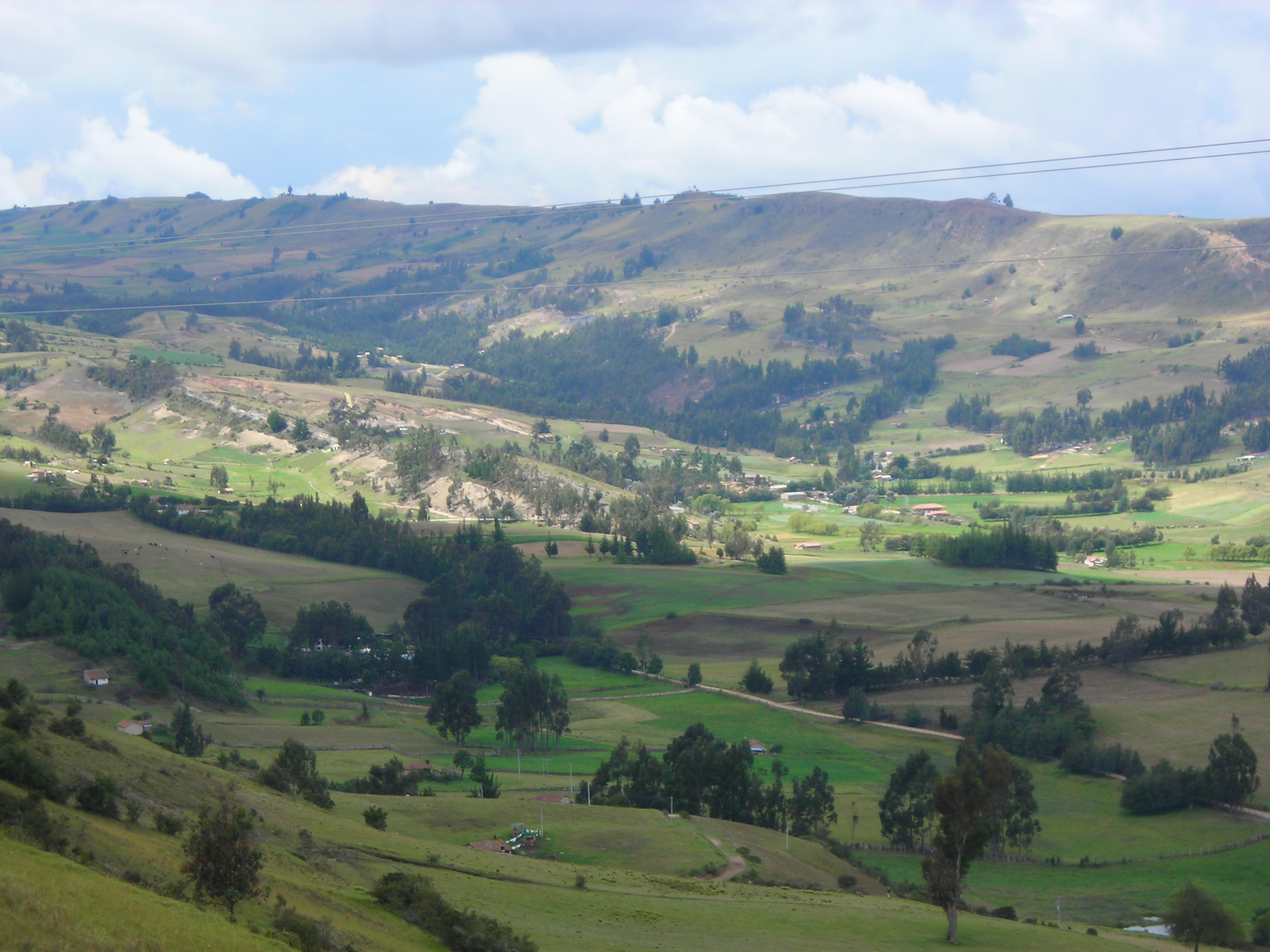
Rural area

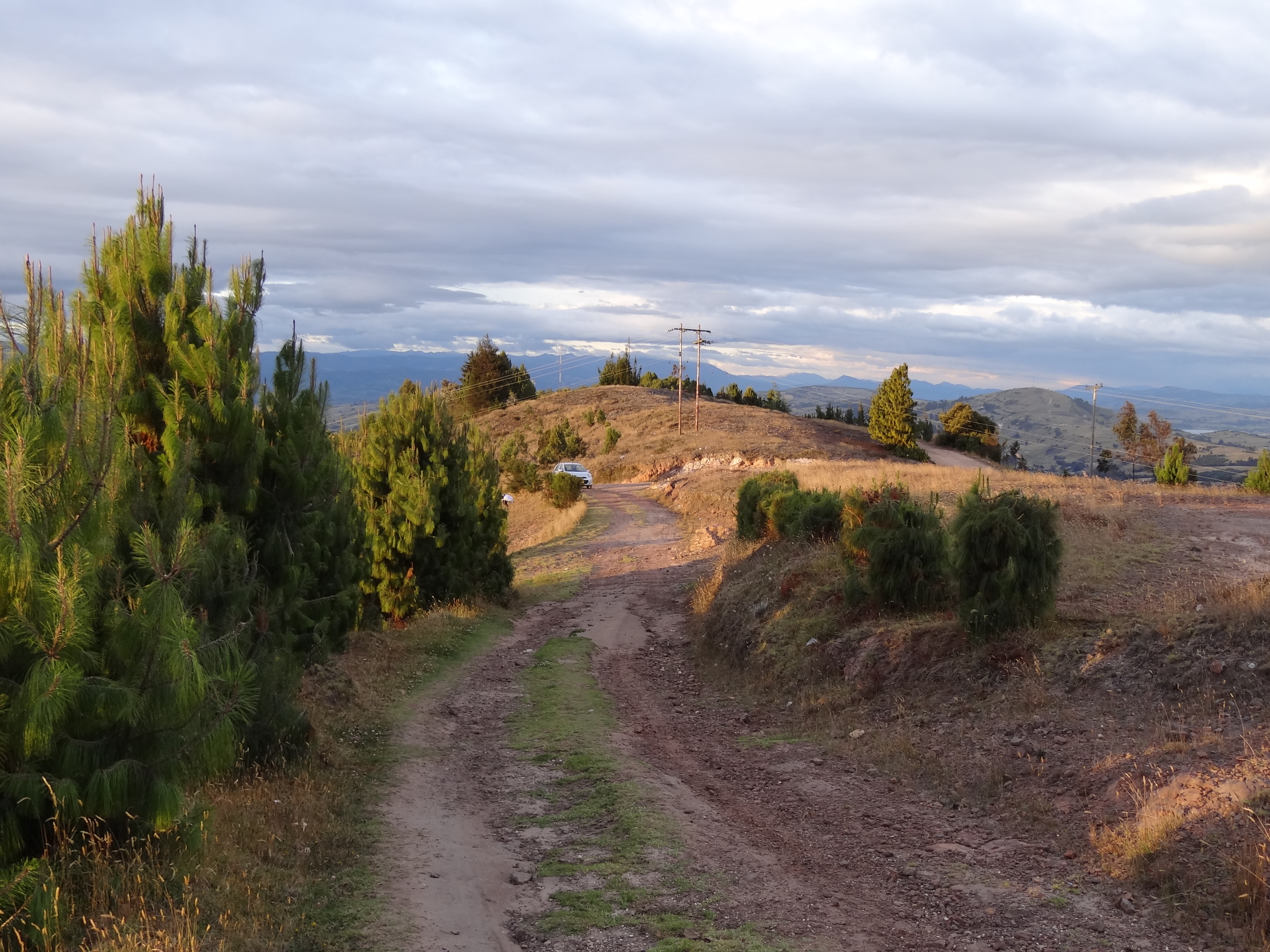
Rural road

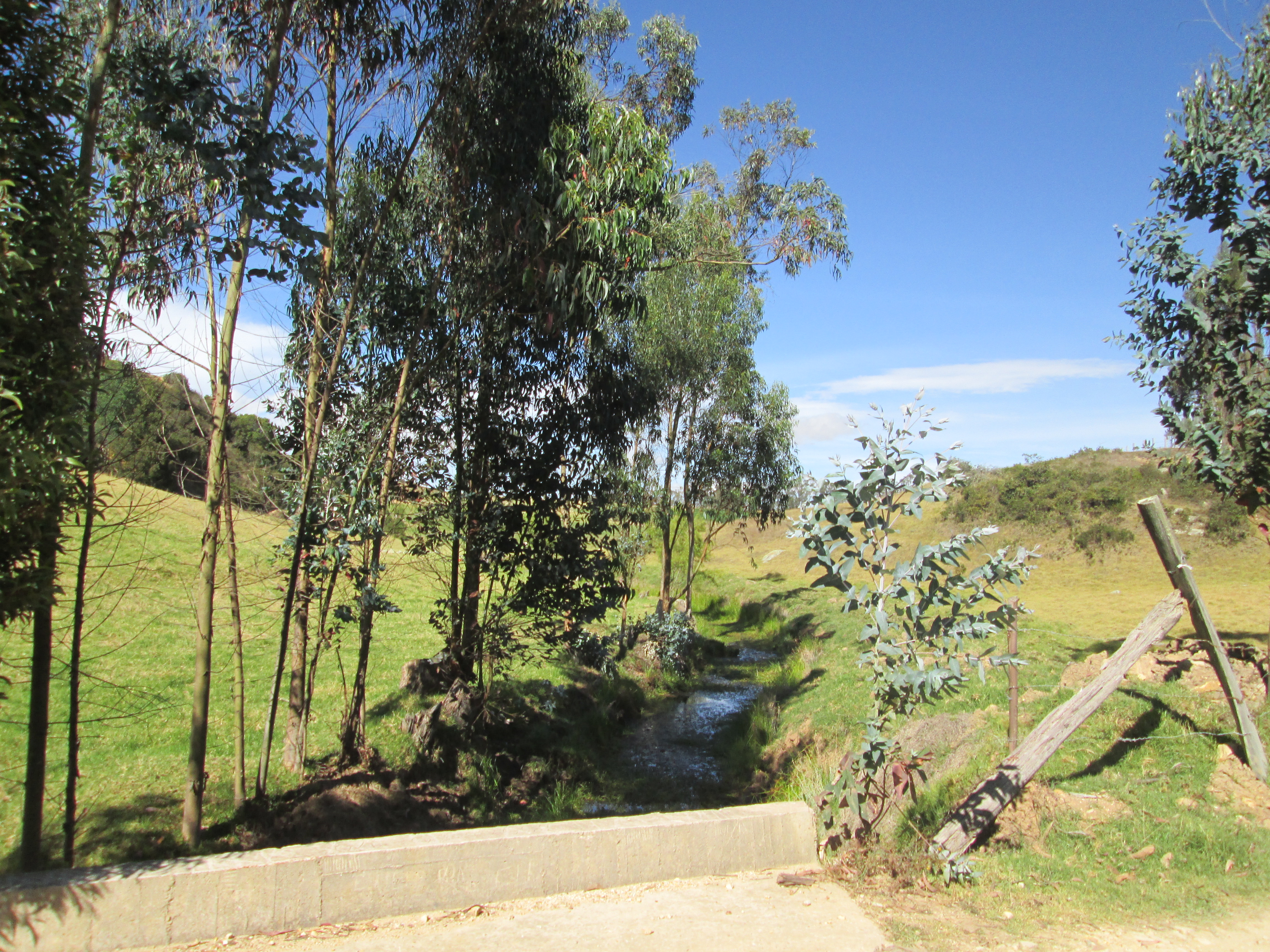
Border of Chivatá and Oicatá
