= Central Boyacá Province =

Central Boyacá Province Provincia de Boyacá Centro
- Province
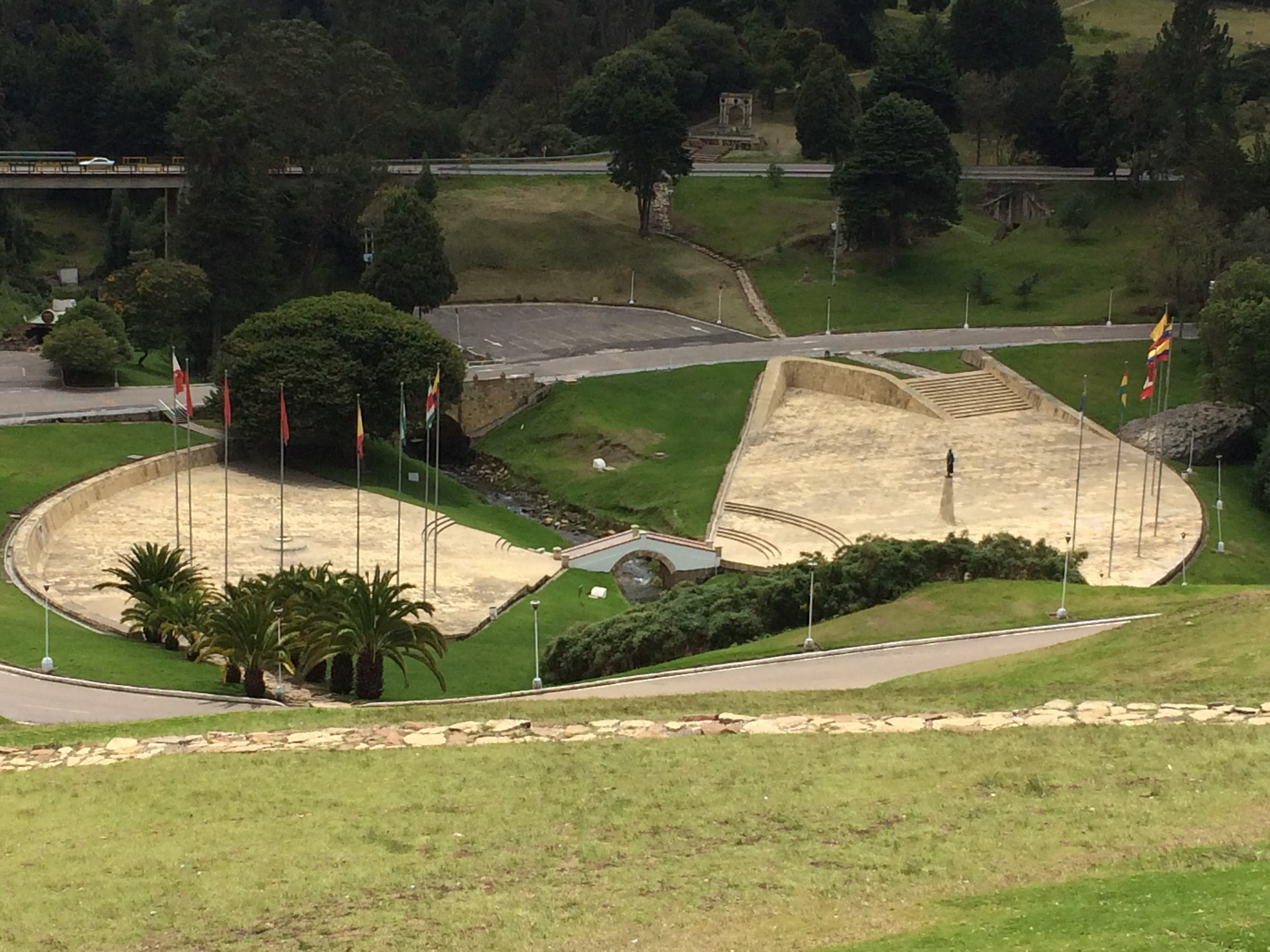
- Puente de Boyacá

- Location of Central Boyacá Province in Colombia
- Coordinates: 5°32′00″N 73°22′00″W
- Country: Colombia
- Department: Boyacá
- Capital: Tunja
- Municipalities: 15
- Time zone: UTC−5 (COT)
- Indigenous groups: Muisca

The Central Boyacá Province (Spanish: Provincia de Centro de Boyacá) is a province of the Colombian Department of Boyacá. The province is formed by fifteen municipalities, including the departmental capital Tunja.

== Municipalities ==
Cómbita • Cucaita • Chíquiza • Chivatá • Motavita • Oicatá • Siachoque • Samacá • Sora • Soracá • Sotaquirá • Toca • Tunja • Tuta • Ventaquemada
