= Siachoque =

Coordinates: 5°30′N 73°14′W

- Municipality and town
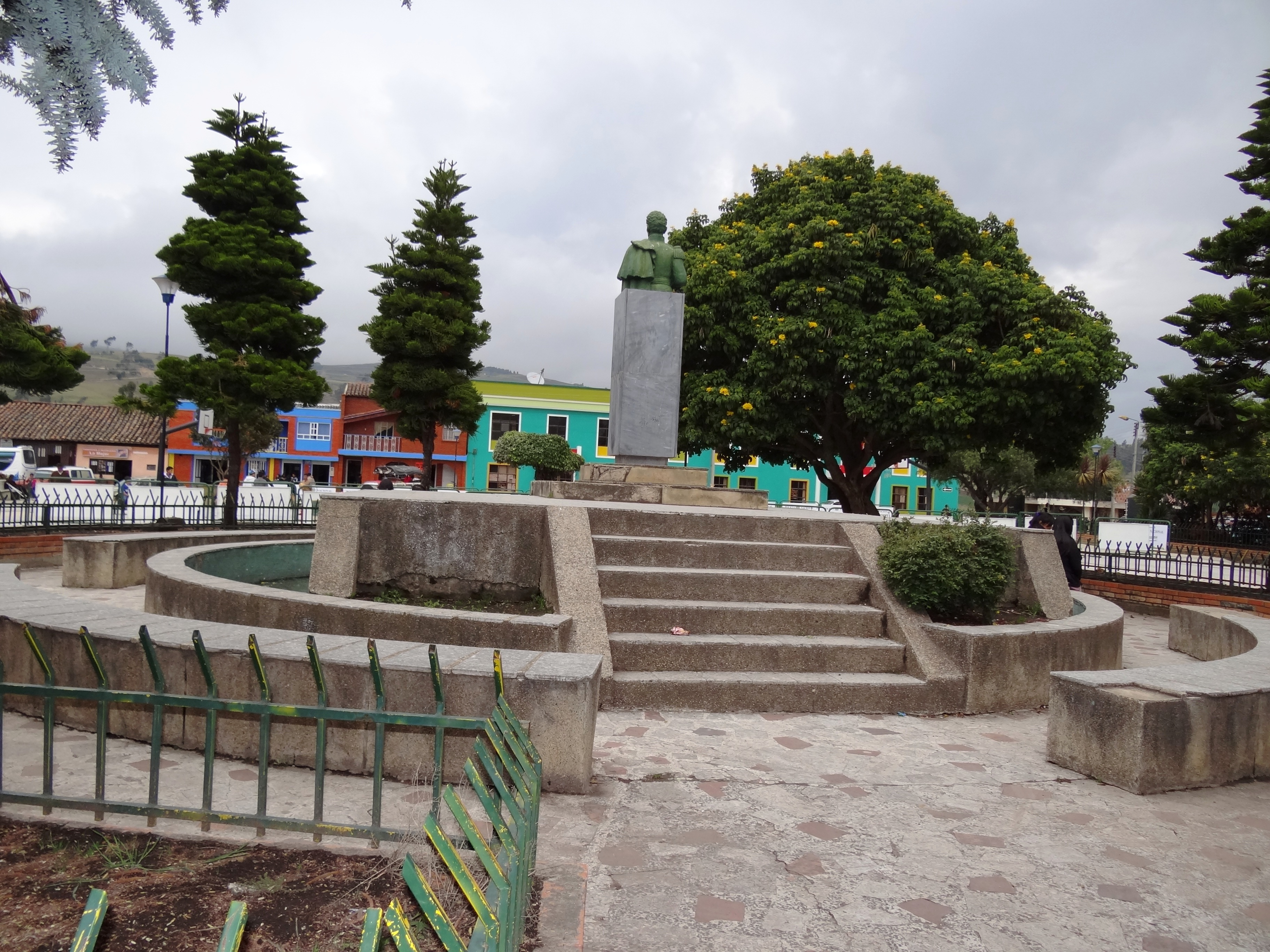
- Central square Siachoque

- Flag

- Location of the municipality and town of Siachoque in the Boyacá Department of Colombia
- Country: Colombia
- Department: Boyacá Department
- Province: Central Boyacá Province
- Founded: 2 August 1556
- Founder: Friar Jerónimo de Peralta

Government
  - Mayor: Jairo Grijalba Lancheros (2020–2023)

Area
  - Municipality and town: 125 km^{2} (48 sq mi)
- Elevation: 2,760 m (9,060 ft)

Population (2015)
  - Municipality and town: 8,964
  - Density: 71.7/km^{2} (186/sq mi)
  - Urban: 1,574
- Time zone: UTC-5 (Colombia Standard Time)
- Website: Official website

Siachoque is a town and municipality in the Central Boyacá Province, part of the Colombian department of Boyacá. Siachoque is situated on the Altiplano Cundiboyacense at a distance of 21 kilometres (13 mi) from the department capital Tunja. It borders Toca in the north, Rondón and Viracachá in the south, in the east Toca, Pesca and Rondón and in the west Soracá and Chivatá.

== Etymology ==
The name Siachoque comes from the Chibcha language of the Muisca people who inhabited the central highlands of present-day Colombia before the Spanish conquest. It is composed of the words Si; "here", a; "from, taste, smell", chó; "good" and que; "vigorous fortress", translating as "place of good smells and strong and vigorous cultures" or "Land of the vigorous taste".

== History ==
Siachoque was part of the loose Muisca Confederation, the former country in the Colombian Andes and the cacique of Siachoque was loyal to the zaque of Hunza. At the defeat of the latter the municipality became part of the New Kingdom of Granada and modern Siachoque was founded on August 2, 1556 by friar Jerónimo de Peralta.

== Economy ==
Main economical activities in Siachoque are agriculture; potatoes, Solanum phureja (papa criolla), maize, oat, barley and wheat, livestock farming and processing of meat and dairy products.

== Gallery ==
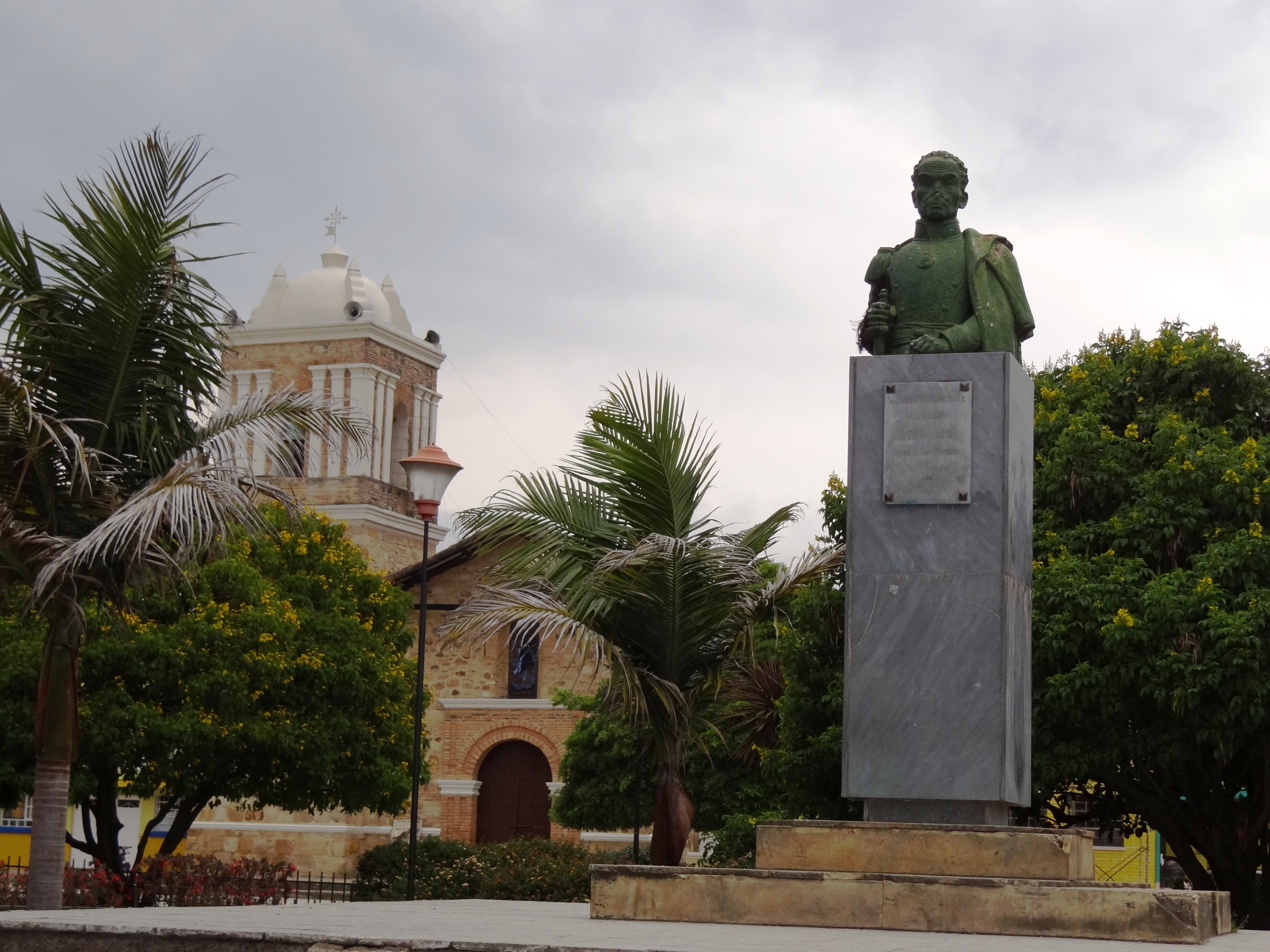
Central square Siachoque

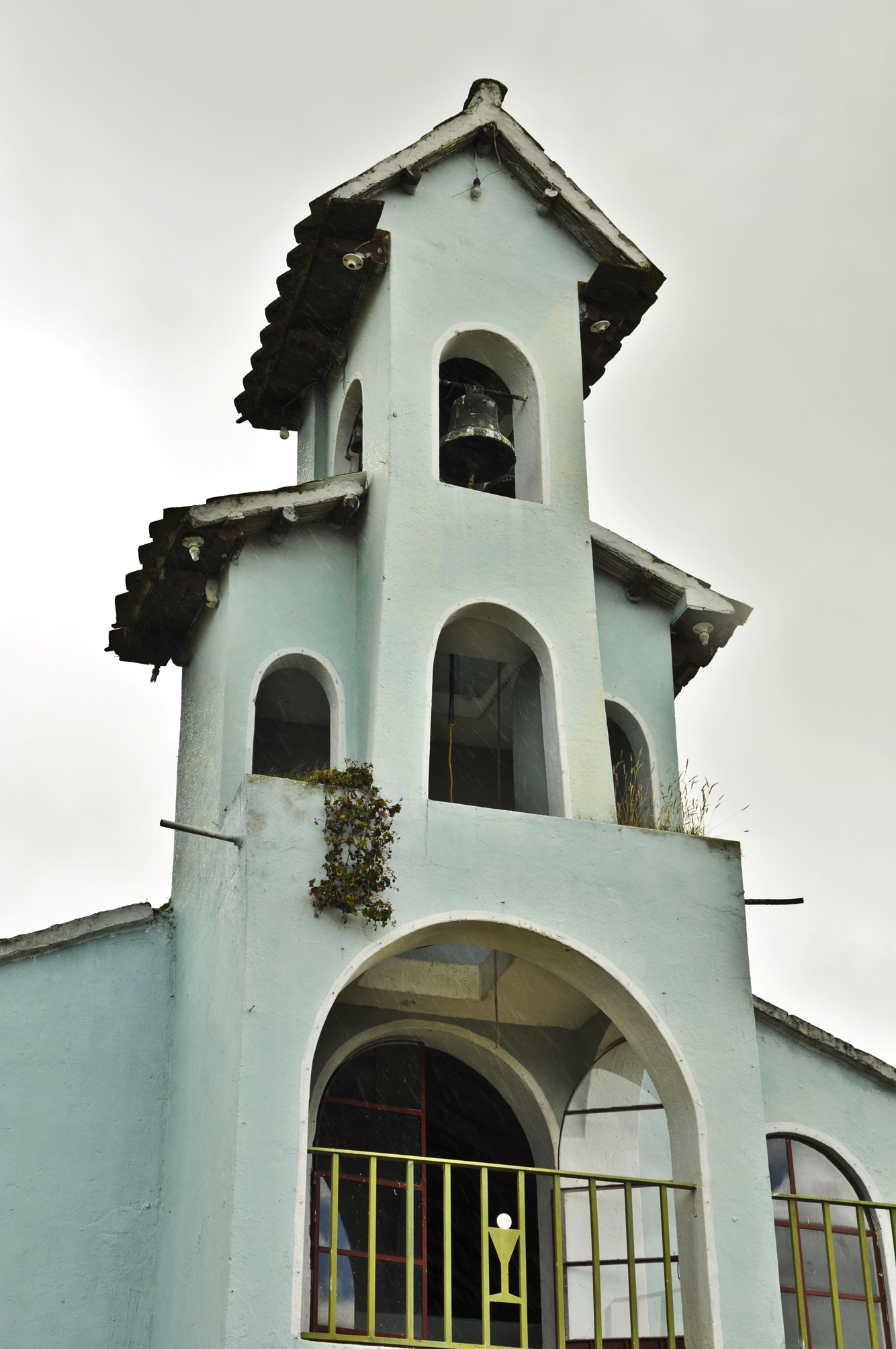
Chapel

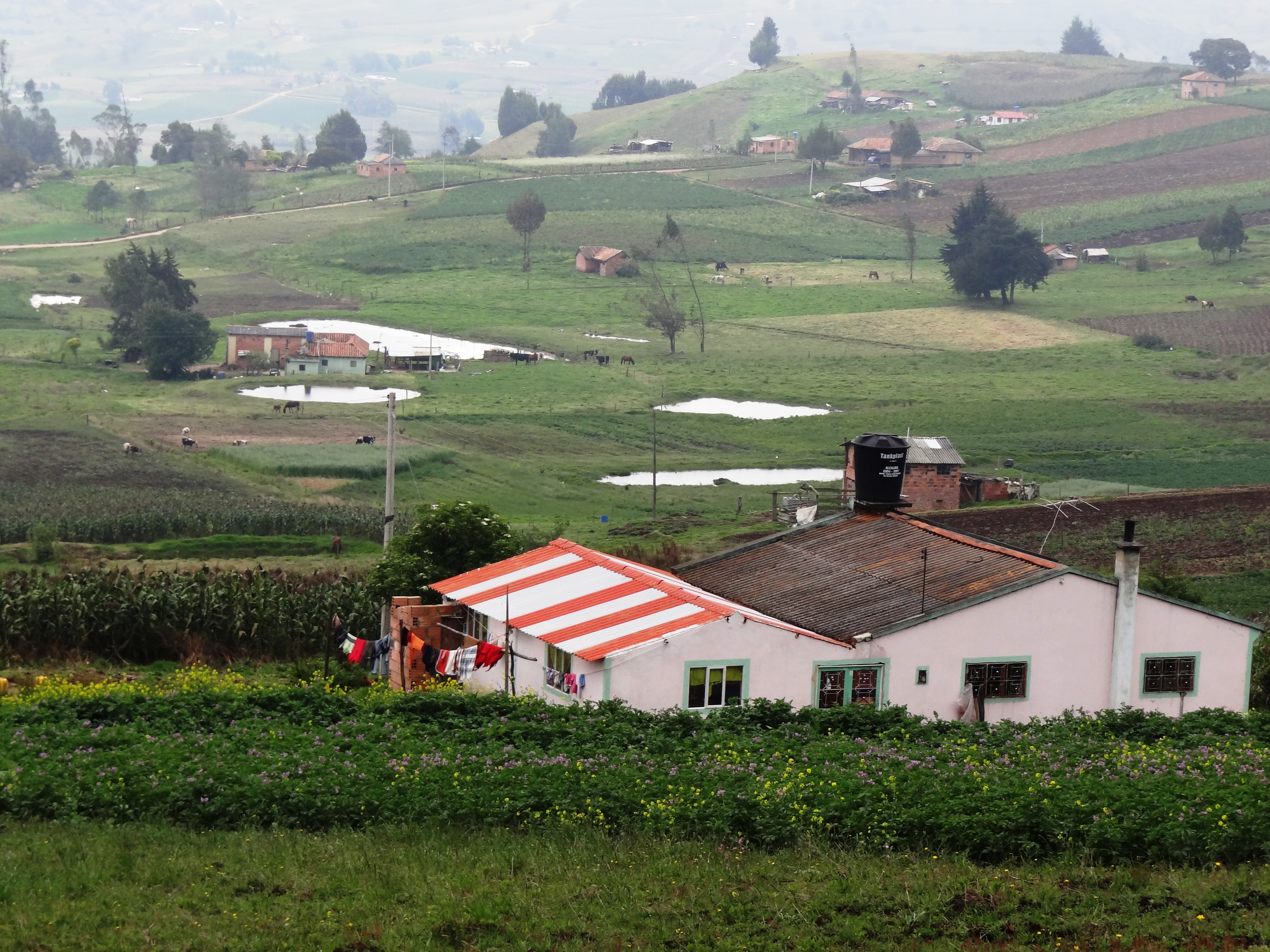
Rural area

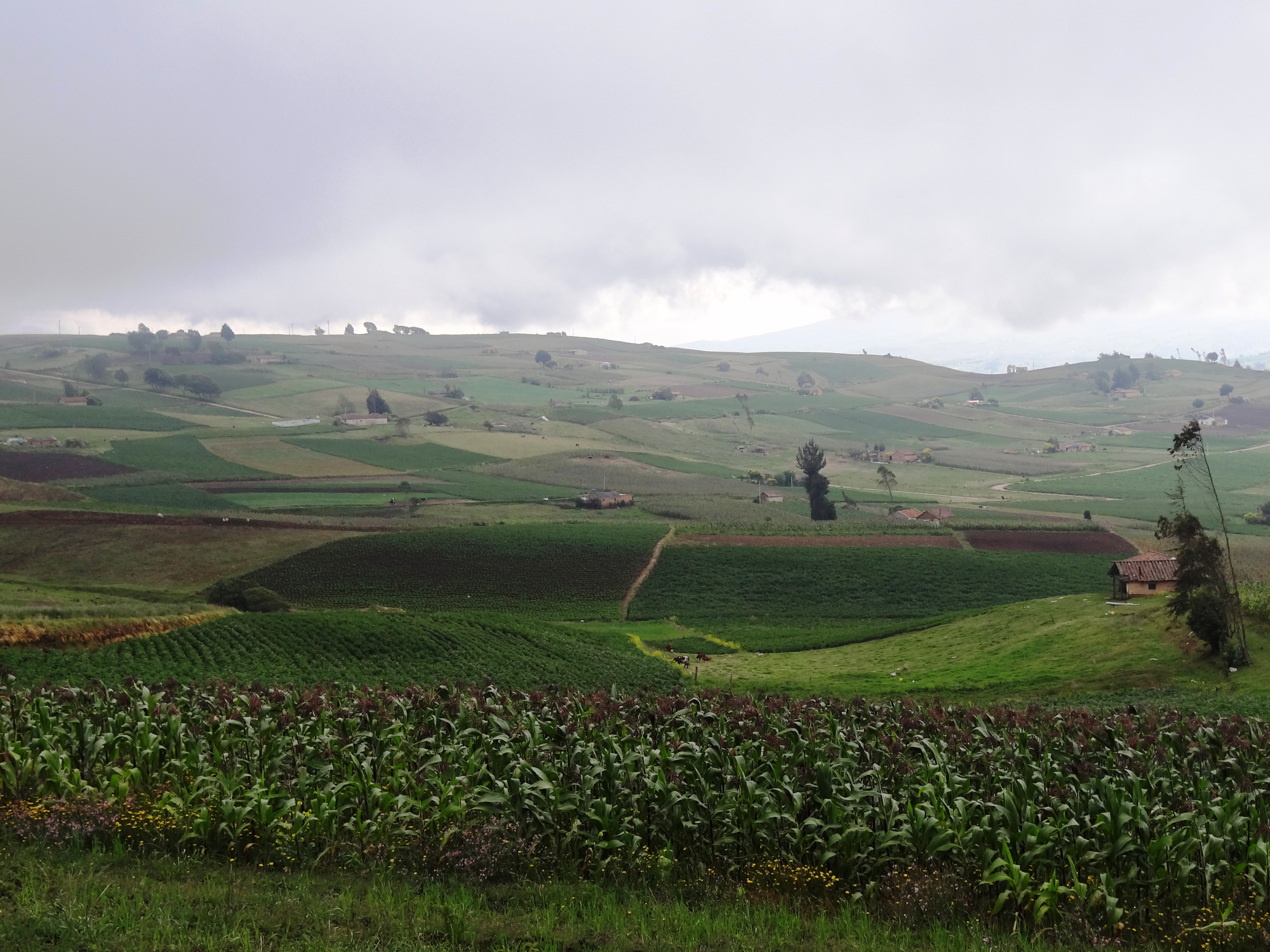
Rural area
