= Úmbita =

Coordinates: 5°13′N 73°28′W

- Municipality and town
- Flag

- Location of the municipality and town of Úmbita in the Boyacá Department of Colombia
- Country: Colombia
- Department: Boyacá Department
- Province: Márquez Province
- Founded: 17 November 1779
- Founder: Gabriel del Toro

Government
  - Mayor: Rafael Ernesto Ramírez Vallejo (2020-2023)

Area
  - Municipality and town: 148.17 km^{2} (57.21 sq mi)
  - Urban: 0.50 km^{2} (0.19 sq mi)
- Elevation: 2,480 m (8,140 ft)

Population (2015)
  - Municipality and town: 10,314
  - Density: 69.609/km^{2} (180.29/sq mi)
  - Urban: 1,830
- Time zone: UTC-5 (Colombia Standard Time)
- Website: Official website

Úmbita is a town and municipality in the Márquez Province, part of the Colombian department of Boyacá. Úmbita is situated on the Altiplano Cundiboyacense at a distance of 70 kilometres (43 mi) from department capital Tunja and borders Nuevo Colón and Tibaná in the north, Chinavita in the east, La Capilla and Tibiritá (Cundinamarca) in the south and in the west Villapinzón (Cundinamarca) and Turmequé. The altitude within the municipality ranges from 1,600 metres (5,200 ft) to 3,400 metres (11,200 ft).

== Etymology ==
The name Úmbita is Chibcha and means "Your point, your summit, summit of the farmlands".

== History ==
Úmbita in the centuries before the arrival of the Spanish conquistadores was inhabited by the Muisca, organized in a loose confederation of different rulers; zaques in Hunza, zipas in Bacatá and other rulers of lower levels such as caciques. Úmbita was ruled by cacique Cochonuba.

The municipality was part of a larger division within Boyacá, called Chivití, shared with the present-day municipality of Nuevo Colón. In 1778 they were split and Úmbita was properly founded on November 17, 1779.

== Economy ==
Úmbita is a very rural municipality with 90% of the inhabitants living outside of the urban center and their economy is focused on agriculture. It is one of the five most productive potato farming villages in Boyacá. Other agricultural products are maize, peas, beans, arracacha, yuca, sugar cane, avocadoes, bananas and coffee. In recent years the fruit industry has grown with fruits such as prunes, apples, peaches, blackberries, pears, tree tomatoes and the typical Colombian fruits curuba and uchuva. Also medicinal plants such as mint, chamomile, plantain leaves and nettle are cultivated.

== Born in Úmbita ==
- José Castelblanco, former professional cyclist
