= Tibaná =

Coordinates: 5°19′N 73°24′W

- Municipality and town
- Flag Coat of arms

- Location of the municipality and town of Tibaná in the Boyacá Department of Colombia
- Country: Colombia
- Department: Boyacá Department
- Province: Márquez Province
- Founded: 12 October 1537
- Founder: Gonzalo Jiménez de Quesada

Government
  - Mayor: Gustavo Alexander García Parra (2020-2023)

Area
  - Municipality and town: 121.76 km^{2} (47.01 sq mi)
  - Urban: 0.45 km^{2} (0.17 sq mi)
- Elevation: 2,115 m (6,939 ft)

Population (2015)
  - Municipality and town: 9,186
  - Density: 75.44/km^{2} (195.4/sq mi)
  - Urban: 1,601
- Time zone: UTC-5 (Colombia Standard Time)
- Website: Official website

Tibaná is a town and municipality in the Colombian Department of Boyacá, part of the subregion of Márquez Province. The urban centre of Tibaná is situated on the Altiplano Cundiboyacense at an altitude of 2,115 metres (6,939 ft) and a distance of 38 kilometres (24 mi) from the department capital Tunja. It borders Jenesano in the north, Ramiriquí and Chinavita in the east, Chinavita and Úmbita in the south and in the west Turmequé and Nuevo Colón.

== Etymology ==
Tibaná is named after the Tibanaes, a Chibcha-speaking tribe of the Muisca. Tiba means "chief".

== History ==
The area around Tibaná was part of the Muisca Confederation and loyal to the zaque of Hunza. Modern Tibaná was founded early in the Spanish conquest; on October 12, 1537 Spanish conquistador Gonzalo Jiménez de Quesada established the village.

== Economy ==
Main economical activity of Tibaná is horticulture (deciduous trees) and agriculture (potatoes). Mining is restricted to small-scale operations, mainly coal, gravel and clay.
