= Motavita =

- Municipality and town
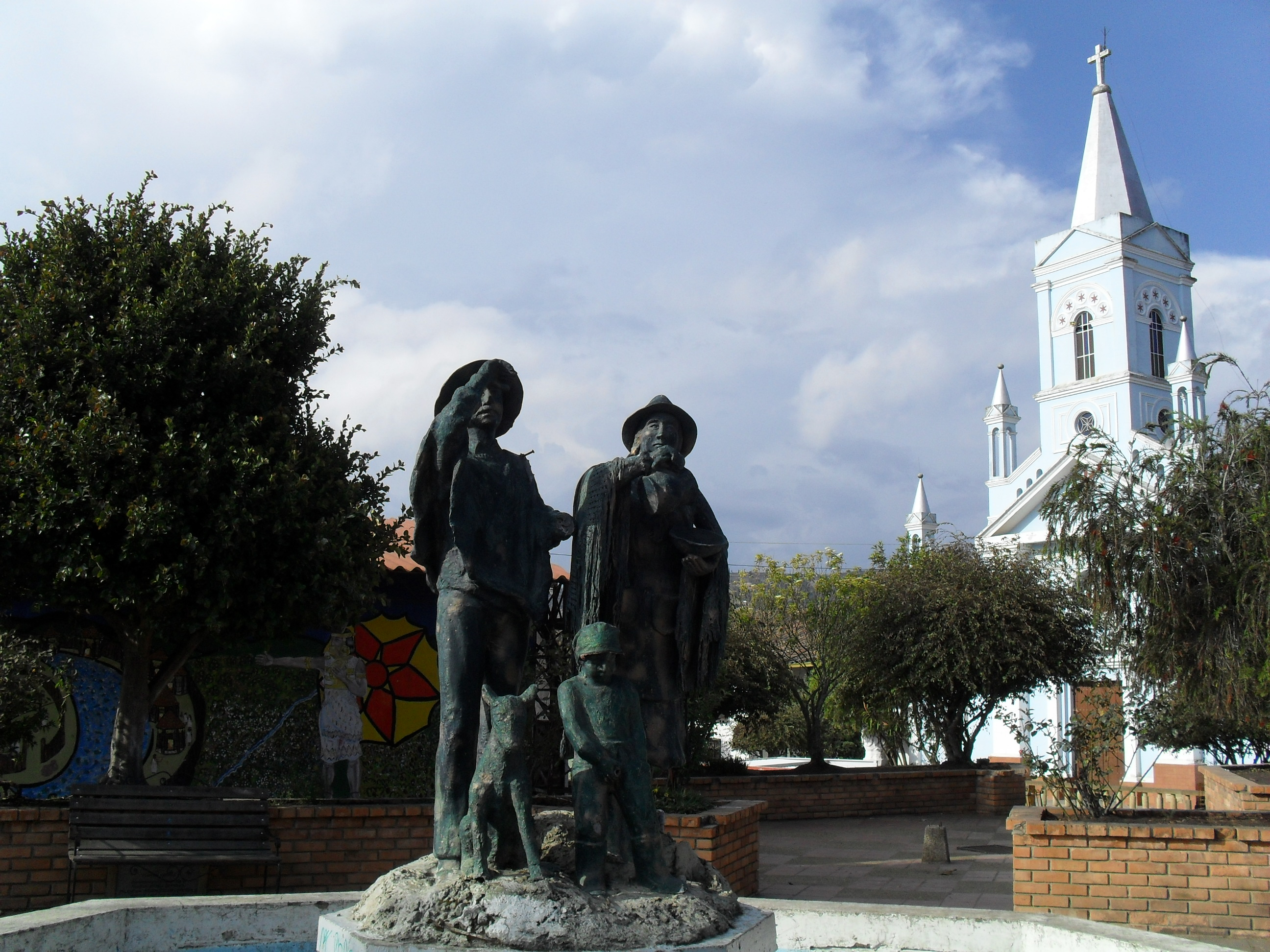
- Central square of Motavita

- Flag Coat of arms

- Location of the municipality and town of Motavita in the Boyacá Department of Colombia
- Coordinates: 05°34′38″N 073°22′02″W
- Country: Colombia
- Department: Boyacá Department
- Province: Central Boyacá Province
- Founded: 23 December 1816

Government
  - Mayor: Mery Mozo Fonseca (2020-2023)

Area
  - Municipality and town: 62 km^{2} (24 sq mi)
- Elevation: 2,690 m (8,830 ft)

Population (2015)
  - Municipality and town: 8,067
  - Urban: 881
- Time zone: UTC-5 (Colombia Standard Time)
- Website: Official website

Motavita is a town and municipality in the Colombian Department of Boyacá, part of the subregion of the Central Boyacá Province. It covers approximately 62 square kilometres (24 sq mi).

== Etymology ==
The name Motavita comes from the Chibcha language and means "washing place to prepare for growing crops", indicating a ceremonial use.

== Geography ==
Motavita is bordered to the north by Arcabuco and Cómbita, to the east and south by Tunja, and to the west by Sora and Chíquiza.

== History ==
In the time before the Spanish conquest of the Muisca, Motavita was inhabited by the Muisca, organised in their loose Muisca Confederation. Motavita was an important settlement in the coca trade with surrounding indigenous groups, such as the Muzo people who populated the western parts of Boyacá. Motavita was ruled by the zaque of nearby Hunza. Conquistador Hernán Pérez de Quesada, brother of Gonzalo Jiménez de Quesada, reached Motavita in 1540. In 1776 the first evangelisation of the Catholic Church was established by friar Juan Pérez. Modern Motavita was founded on 23 December 1816 and its first mayor was Marino Monrroy.

== Divisions ==
Motavita was divided into five cadastral vereda (townships): Centro, Carbonera, Ristá, Salvial and Sote Panelas; however, Sote Panelas had four more veredas split off from it, namely: Frutillal, Versalles, Quebrada Honda and Barro Hondo, thus making nine vereda.

== Born in Motavita ==
- Jefferson Vargas, professional cyclist
