= Cómbita =

Coordinates: 5°45′N 73°15′W

- Municipality and town
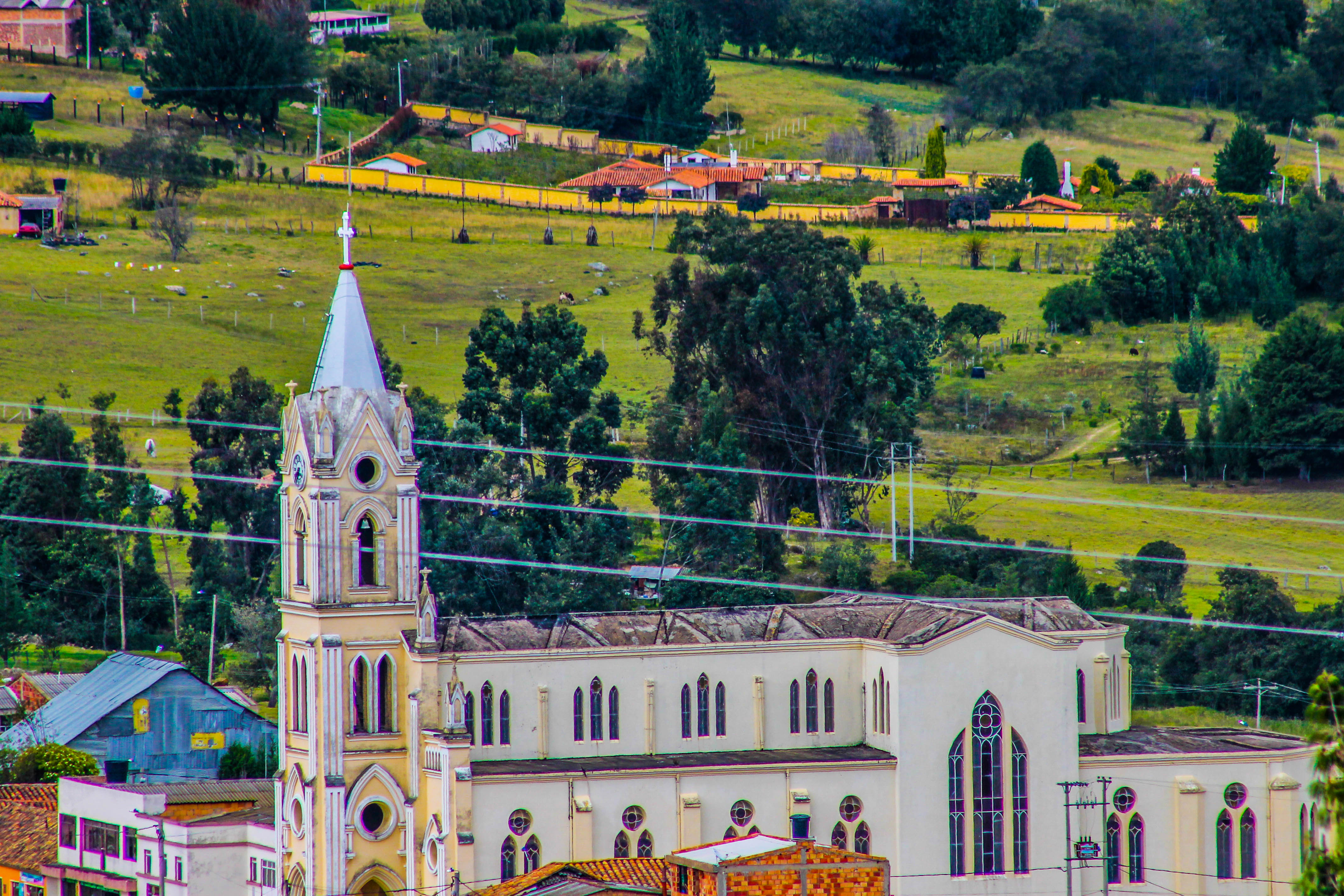
- Church of Cómbita

- Flag

- Location of the municipality and town of Cómbita in the Boyacá Department of Colombia.
- Country: Colombia
- Department: Boyacá Department
- Province: Central Boyacá Province
- Founded: 1586

Government
  - Mayor: Nelson Pérez Suárez (2020-2023)

Area
  - Municipality and town: 149 km^{2} (58 sq mi)
  - Urban: 85.6 km^{2} (33.1 sq mi)
- Elevation: 2,825 m (9,268 ft)

Population (2015)
  - Municipality and town: 14,632
  - Density: 98.2/km^{2} (254/sq mi)
  - Urban: 1,107
- Time zone: UTC-5 (Colombia Standard Time)
- Website: Official website

Cómbita is a town and municipality in the Colombian Department of Boyacá, part of the sub region of the Central Boyacá Province. Cómbita is situated on the Altiplano Cundiboyacense and borders Arcabuco and the department of Santander in the north, Sotaquirá in the northeast, Tuta and Oicatá in the east, department capital Tunja at 8.5 kilometres (5.3 mi) away and Motavita in the south and Arcabuco and Motavita in the west.

== History ==
Cómbita was in the time before the arrival of the Spanish conquistadores inhabited by the Muisca, organized in their loose Muisca Confederation. The ruler of the northern Muisca was the zaque of Hunza, modern day Tunja. The cacique of Cómbita was loyal to the zaque.

In the Chibcha language of the Muisca, Cómbita means either "Hand of the jaguar and wheel of life" or "Force of the summit".

Modern Cómbita was founded in 1586.

== Economy ==
The economical activities of Cómbita are agriculture; potatoes, barley, wheat, maize and peas, and livestock farming.

== Notable people ==
- Pedro Medina Avendaño, Colombian lawyer and poet
- Nairo Quintana, professional cyclist, Giro d'Italia general classification winner, Vuelta a España general classification winner, 2nd place in the Tour de France of 2013 and 2015
- Dayer Quintana, professional cyclist, brother of Nairo
- Héctor Helí Rojas Jiménez, lawyer and politician
- Ismael Sarmiento, former professional cyclist

== Gallery ==
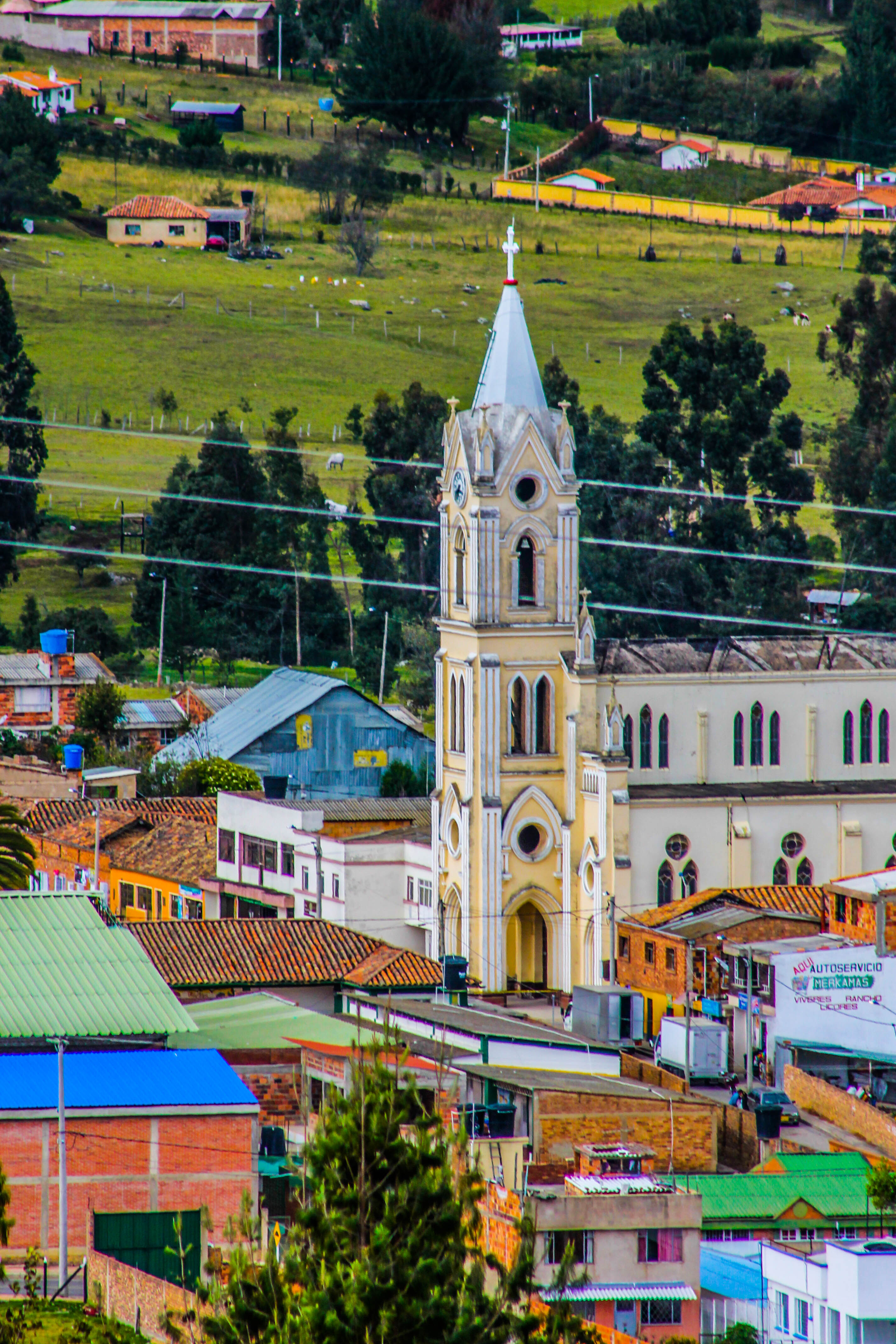
Church
