= Viracachá =

Coordinates: 5°26′N 73°18′W

- Municipality and town
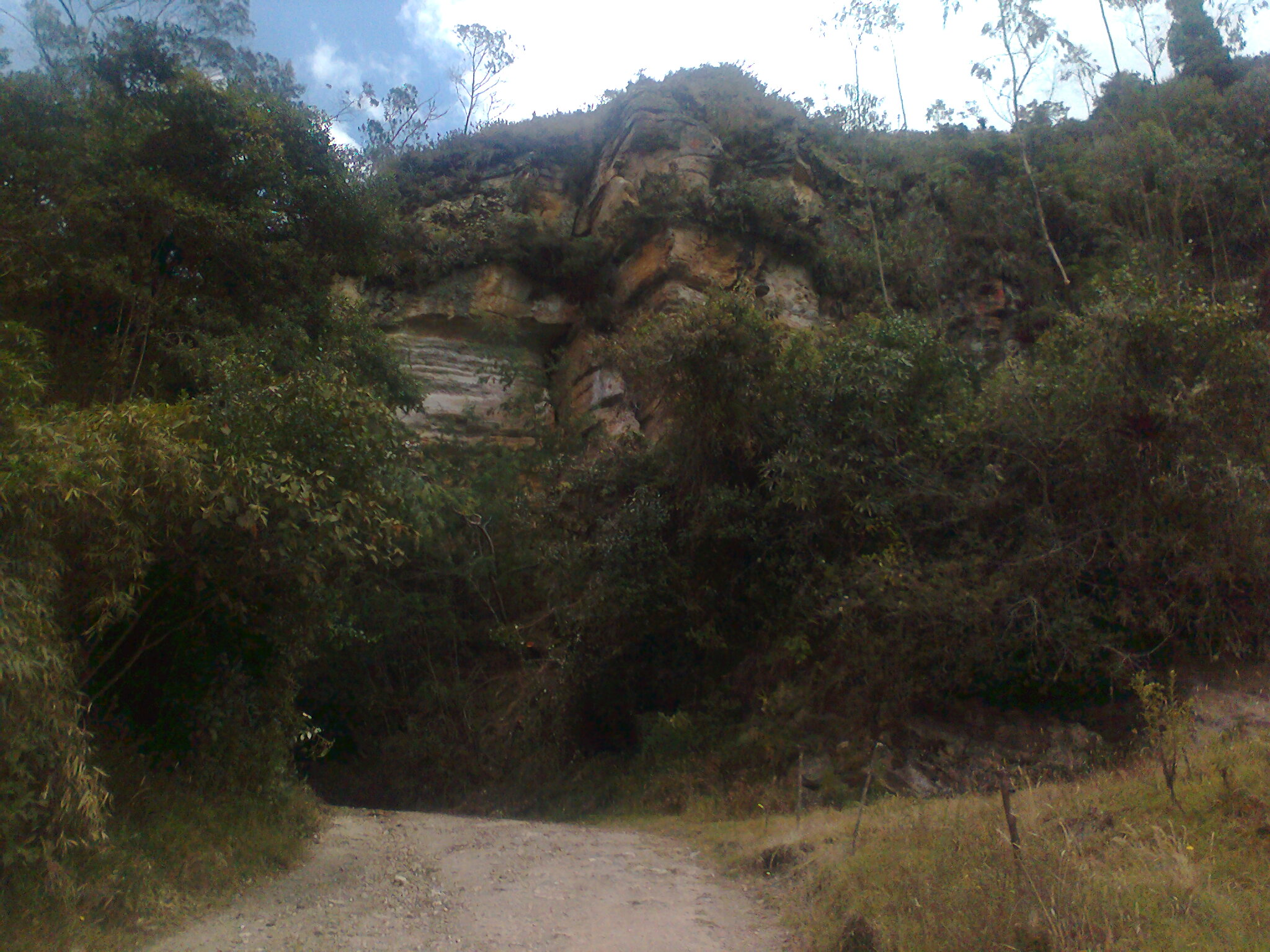
- Ancient road used by the Muisca in Viracachá

- Flag

- Location of the municipality and town of Viracachá in the Boyacá Department of Colombia
- Country: Colombia
- Department: Boyacá Department
- Province: Márquez Province
- Founded: 15 February 1556

Government
  - Mayor: Gregorio Rodríguez Soler (2020-2023)

Area
  - Municipality and town: 68 km^{2} (26 sq mi)
  - Urban: 1 km^{2} (0.39 sq mi)
- Elevation: 2,520 m (8,270 ft)

Population (2015)
  - Municipality and town: 3,222
  - Density: 47/km^{2} (120/sq mi)
  - Urban: 374
- Time zone: UTC-5 (Colombia Standard Time)
- Website: Official website

Viracachá is a town and municipality in the Márquez Province, Colombia, part of the Colombian department of Boyacá. Viracachá is situated on the Altiplano Cundiboyacense at 22 kilometres (14 mi) from the department capital Tunja and the small urban center at 2,520 metres (8,270 ft) above sea level. Other parts of Viracachá reach 3,200 metres (10,500 ft). The municipality borders Siachoque, Rondón and Soracá in the north and east, in the south Ciénega and Ciénega, Soracá and Ramiriquí in the west.

== Etymology ==
About the name Viracachá exist different interpretations. One interpretation says the name is derived from Quechua and means "air of the lake". Another attributes it to Chibcha meaning "lord of the enclosure of the wind".

== History ==
In the centuries before the Spanish conquest Viracachá was inhabited by the Muisca, organized in their loose Muisca Confederation. Due to its proximity to the northern capital Hunza, Viracachá was ruled by the zaque. Modern Viracachá was founded by Dominican missionaries on February 15, 1556.

== Economy ==
Viracachá is a rural village where most of the people work in the tertiary sector of services. Also agriculture and chicken farming is executed. The town does not have a bank.

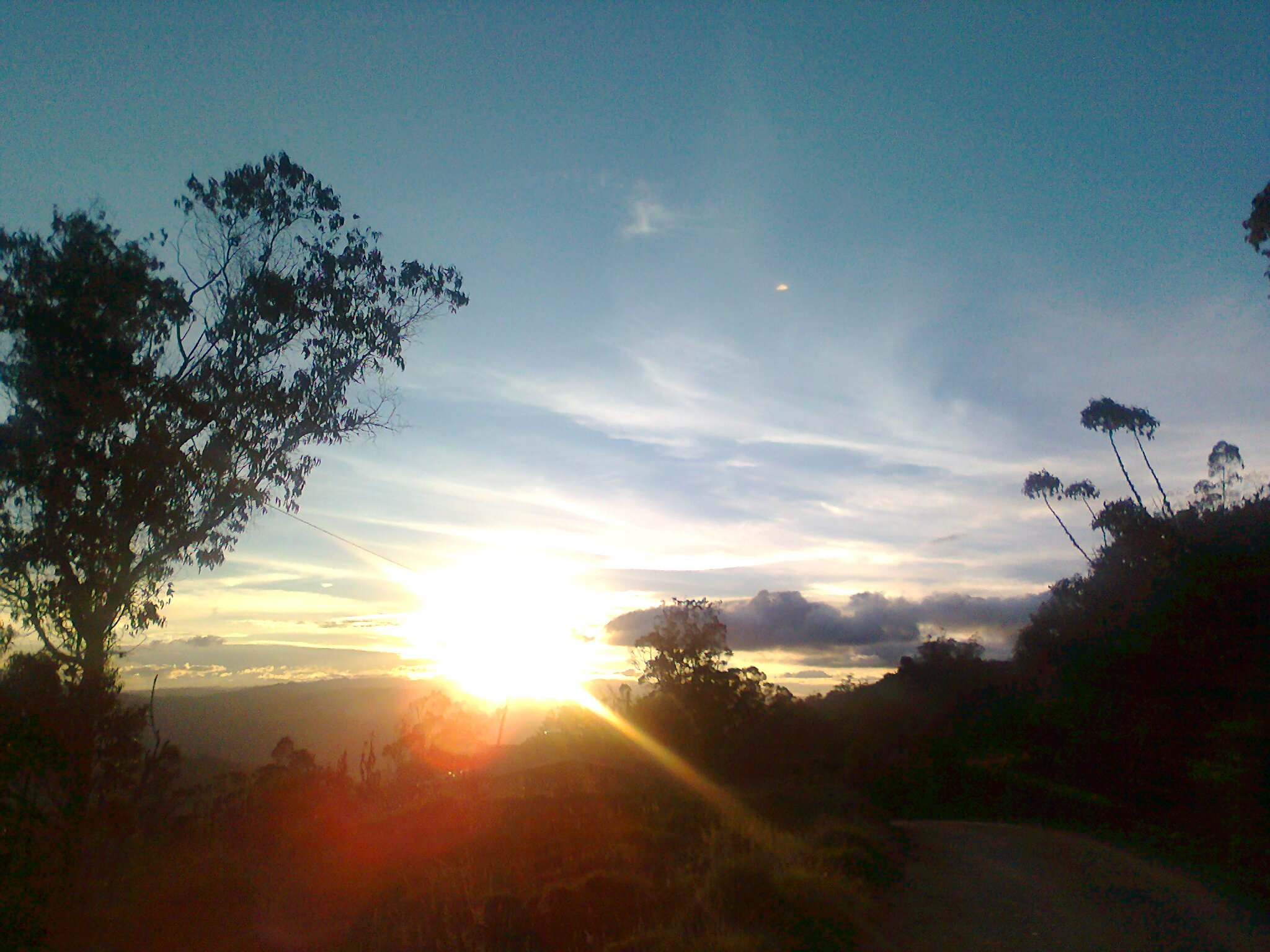
Sunset in Viracachá
