= Rondón, Boyacá =

Rondón San Rafael
- Municipality and town
- Flag Coat of arms

- Location of the municipality and town of Rondón in the Boyacá Department of Colombia
- Coordinates: 5°21′24″N 73°12′31″W
- Country: Colombia
- Department: Boyacá Department
- Province: Márquez Province
- Founded: 30 June 1904
- Founder: Ignacio Aristides Medina Ávila

Government
  - Mayor: Sandro Rodolfo Borda Rojas (2020-2023)

Area
  - Municipality and town: 258 km^{2} (100 sq mi)
  - Urban: 0.8 km^{2} (0.31 sq mi)
- Elevation: 2,075 m (6,808 ft)

Population (2015)
  - Municipality and town: 2,934
  - Density: 11.4/km^{2} (29.5/sq mi)
- Time zone: UTC-5 (Colombia Standard Time)
- Website: Official website

Rondón is a town and municipality in the Márquez Province, part of Boyacá Department, Colombia. The urban centre of Rondón is situated at an altitude of 2,075 metres (6,808 ft) on the Altiplano Cundiboyacense in the Colombian Eastern Ranges of the Andes. It is 61 kilometres (38 mi) away from the departmental capital Tunja. Rondón borders Viracachá and Siachoque in the north, Zetaquirá and Ramiriquí in the south, Pesca in the east and Ramiriquí and Ciénega in the west.

== Etymology ==
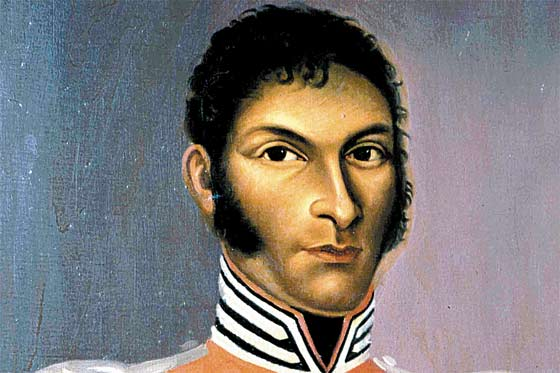
Juan José Rondón

Rondón was previously known as San Rafael, and earlier, the area of Rondón was referred to as La Galera, a forested terrain. It received the name Rondón honouring the independence hero of the Battle of Vargas Swamp Juan José Rondón.

== History ==
The terrain of Rondón was completely forested until the mid 19th century, when the lands passed through various families of land owners. The newly founded settlement was populated by people coming from Ramiriquí, Ciénega, Viracachá and Pesca. The town received the status of municipality on June 30, 1904, by Ignacio Aristides Medina Ávila.

== Economy ==
Main economic activities in Rondón are livestock farming and agriculture. Among the products cultivated are lulo, sugarcane, coffee, bananas, oranges, yuca, arracacha, beans, peas, avocadoes, guayaba, chirimoya, guanábana, potatoes and maize.

== Climate ==
Climate data for Rondón, elevation 2,120 m (6,960 ft), (1981–2010)
Month	Jan	Feb	Mar	Apr	May	Jun	Jul	Aug	Sep	Oct	Nov	Dec	Year
Mean daily maximum °C (°F)	22.7 (72.9)	23.0 (73.4)	22.4 (72.3)	21.3 (70.3)	20.7 (69.3)	19.2 (66.6)	18.5 (65.3)	19.1 (66.4)	20.9 (69.6)	21.6 (70.9)	21.7 (71.1)	22.0 (71.6)	21.0 (69.8)
Daily mean °C (°F)	16.5 (61.7)	16.6 (61.9)	16.6 (61.9)	16.3 (61.3)	16.1 (61.0)	15.4 (59.7)	15.1 (59.2)	15.2 (59.4)	15.8 (60.4)	16.1 (61.0)	16.3 (61.3)	16.3 (61.3)	16.0 (60.8)
Mean daily minimum °C (°F)	12.2 (54.0)	12.6 (54.7)	12.8 (55.0)	13.0 (55.4)	12.8 (55.0)	12.3 (54.1)	11.9 (53.4)	11.8 (53.2)	12.2 (54.0)	12.5 (54.5)	12.8 (55.0)	12.5 (54.5)	12.4 (54.3)
Average precipitation mm (inches)	38.7 (1.52)	64.7 (2.55)	99.1 (3.90)	182.6 (7.19)	262.9 (10.35)	263.5 (10.37)	271.7 (10.70)	215.9 (8.50)	157.1 (6.19)	192.2 (7.57)	188.0 (7.40)	83.0 (3.27)	2,019.3 (79.50)
Average precipitation days (≥ 1.0 mm)	10	13	15	22	25	26	27	26	22	21	22	15	240
Average relative humidity (%)	83	84	84	87	88	91	91	90	87	86	87	86	87
Mean monthly sunshine hours	173.6	141.2	127.1	93.0	83.7	60.0	62.0	71.3	111.0	130.2	129.0	136.4	1,318.5
Mean daily sunshine hours	5.6	5.0	4.1	3.1	2.7	2.0	2.0	2.3	3.7	4.2	4.3	4.4	3.6
Source: Instituto de Hidrologia Meteorologia y Estudios Ambientales
