= Jenesano =

Jenesano Piranguata, Genazzano
- Municipality and town
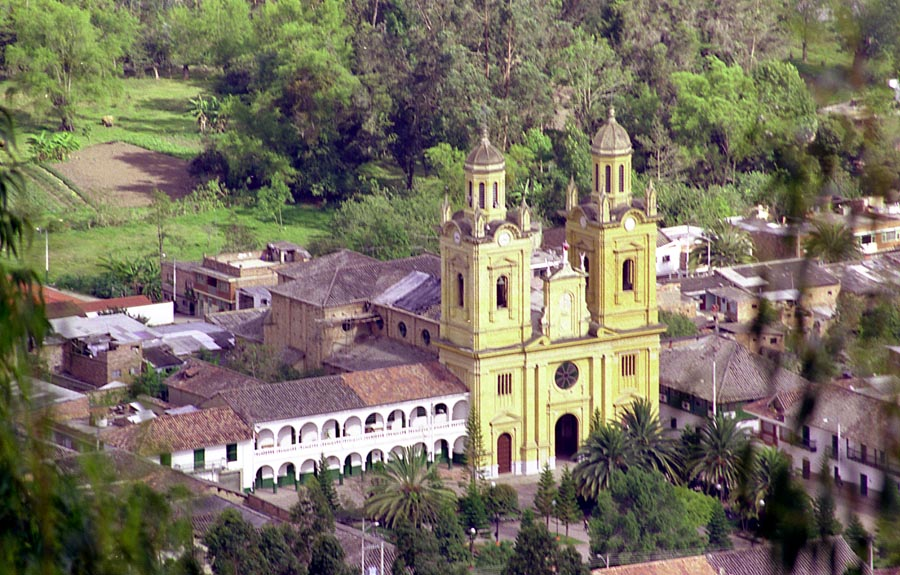
- View of Jenesano

- Flag Coat of arms

- Location of the municipality and town of Jenesano in the Boyacá Department of Colombia

- Location in Colombia
- Coordinates: 5°23′N 73°22′W
- Country: Colombia
- Department: Boyacá Department
- Province: Márquez Province
- Founded: 25 February 1828

Government
  - Mayor: Nubia Jacqueline Caro Pérez (2020-2023)

Area
  - Municipality and town: 59 km^{2} (23 sq mi)
  - Urban: 0.55 km^{2} (0.21 sq mi)
- Elevation: 2,100 m (6,900 ft)

Population (2015)
  - Municipality and town: 7,640
  - Density: 130/km^{2} (340/sq mi)
  - Urban: 1,980
- Time zone: UTC-5 (Colombia Standard Time)
- Website: Official website

Jenesano is a town and municipality in the Márquez Province, part of the Colombian Department of Boyacá. The urban centre is located at an altitude of 2,100 metres (6,900 ft) on the Altiplano Cundiboyacense. Jenesano borders Nuevo Colón in the west, Ramiriquí in the east, Boyacá, Boyacá in the north and Tibaná in the south.

== Etymology ==
Jenesano was called Piranguata at time of foundation. The name was changed in 1833 to Genazzano, referring to the province in Italy. Later, it became Jenesano, meaning "healthy people" or "healthy village".

== History ==
The area of Jenesano before the Spanish conquest was inhabited by the Muisca, organised in their loose Muisca Confederation. Jenesano was part of the rule of the zaque of Hunza.

Modern Jenesano was not founded until 1828, after the independence of Colombia from the Spanish Empire.

== Economy ==
Main activity of Jenesano is agriculture, predominantly fruits as uchuva, tree tomatoes, cucumbers, peas, beans, maize, peaches, pears and apples.

== Gallery ==
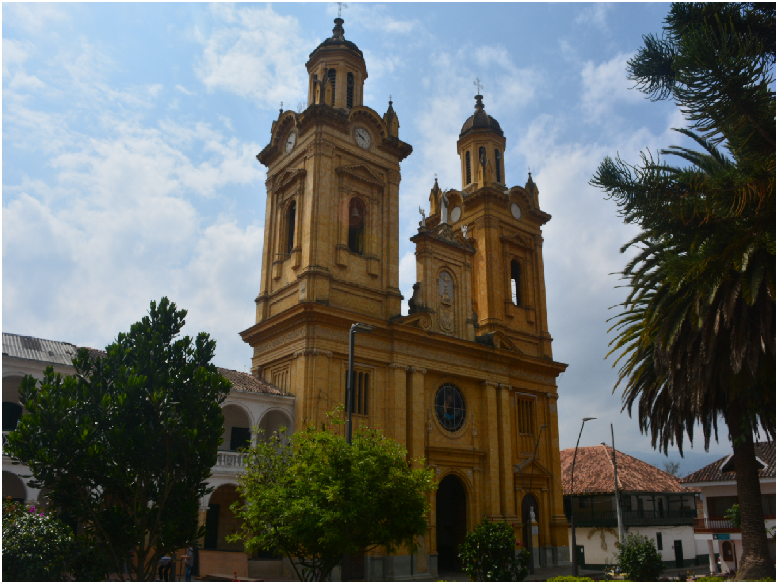
Church of Jenesano
