= Márquez Province =

Márquez Province Provincia de Márquez
- Province
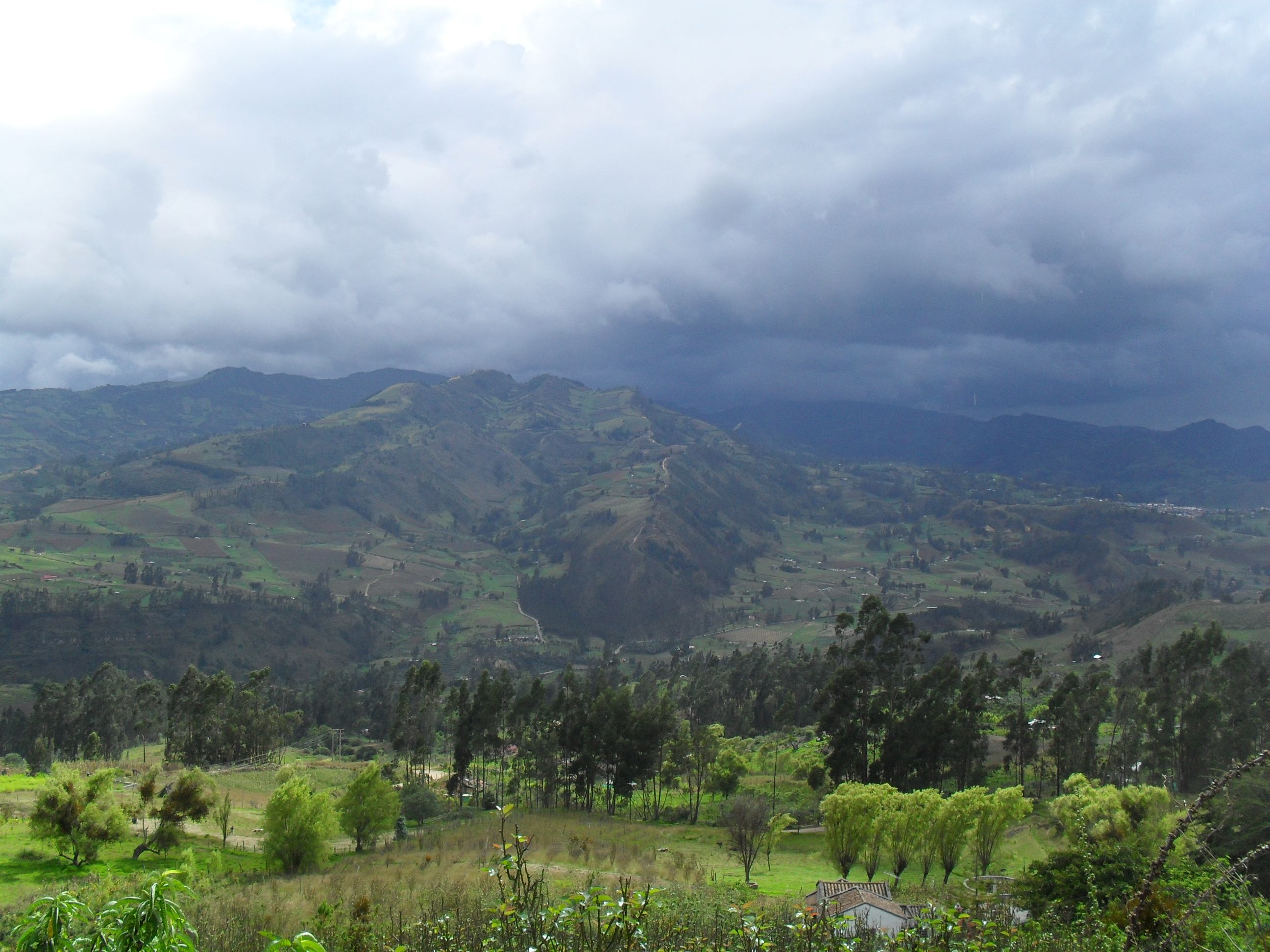
- Landscape around Turmequé
- Etymology: José Ignacio de Márquez
- Location of Márquez Province in Colombia
- Coordinates: 5°24′00″N 73°20′15″W
- Country: Colombia
- Department: Boyacá
- Capital: Ramiriquí
- Municipalities: 10
- Time zone: UTC−5 (COT)
- Indigenous groups: Muisca

The Márquez Province is a province of Boyacá Department, Colombia. The province is formed by 10 municipalities.

== Municipalities ==
Boyacá • Ciénaga • Jenesano • Nuevo Colón • Ramiriquí • Rondón • Tibaná • Turmequé • Úmbita • Viracachá
