= Soracá =

Coordinates: 5°30′N 73°19′W

- Municipality and town
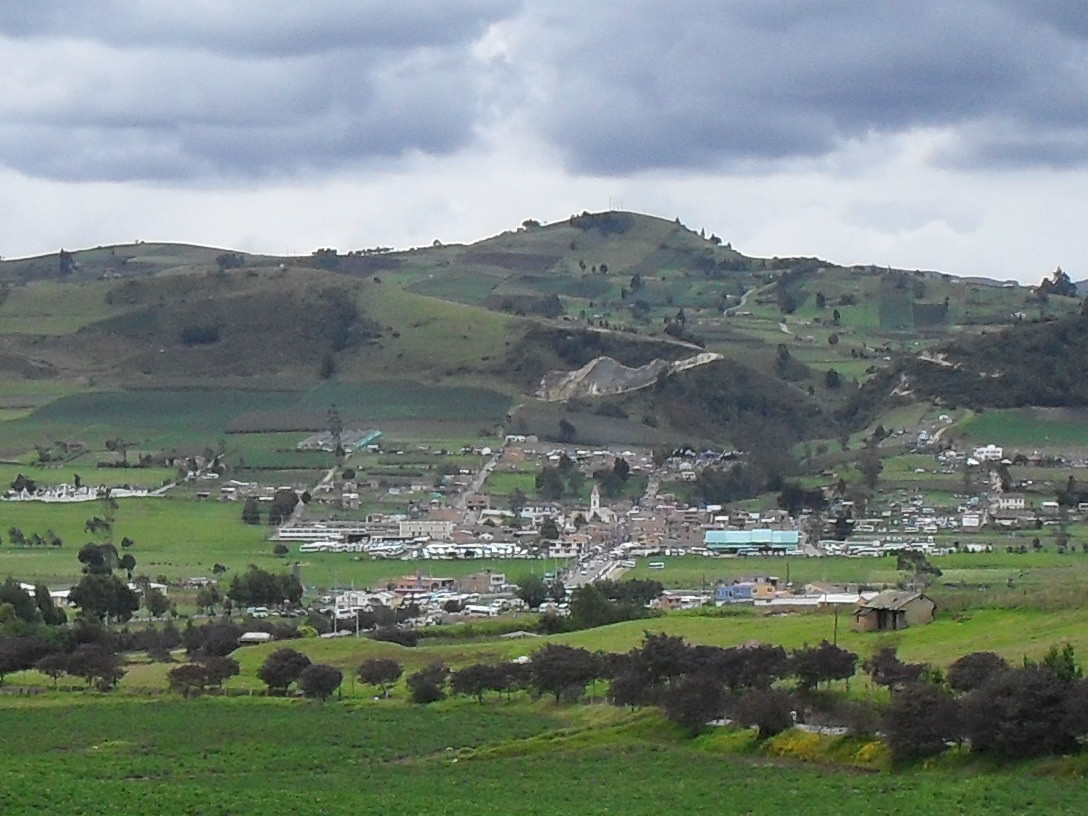
- View of Soracá

- Flag

- Location of the municipality and town of Soracá in the Boyacá Department of Colombia
- Country: Colombia
- Department: Boyacá Department
- Province: Central Boyacá Province
- Founded: 7 October 1776

Government
  - Mayor: José Misael Neva Ocación (2020–2023)

Area
  - Municipality and town: 57 km^{2} (22 sq mi)
  - Urban: 27 km^{2} (10 sq mi)
- Elevation: 2,942 m (9,652 ft)

Population (2015)
  - Municipality and town: 5,353
  - Density: 94/km^{2} (240/sq mi)
  - Urban: 751
- Time zone: UTC-5 (Colombia Standard Time)
- Website: Official website

Soracá is a town and municipality in the Colombian Department of Boyacá, part of the subregion of the Central Boyacá Province. Soracá borders the municipalities of Chivatá in the north, Siachoque, Viracacha and Ramiriquí in the east, Boyacá in the south and the department capital Tunja in the west.

== Etymology ==
In Chibcha, Soracá means "ruling mansion of the sovereign".

== History ==
The area of Soracá was part of the zacazgo of Hunza, presently known as Tunja in the time before the Spanish conquest of the Muisca. The Muisca inhabiting the Altiplano Cundiboyacense and their confederation were an advanced civilization who spoke Chibcha. In the 1530s the Spanish conquistadores led by Gonzalo Jiménez de Quesada entered the territories of the Muisca.

== Economy ==
Main economical activities in Soracá are dairy production, mining and production of bricks.

== Born in Soracá ==
- Graciano Fonseca, professional cyclist

== Gallery ==
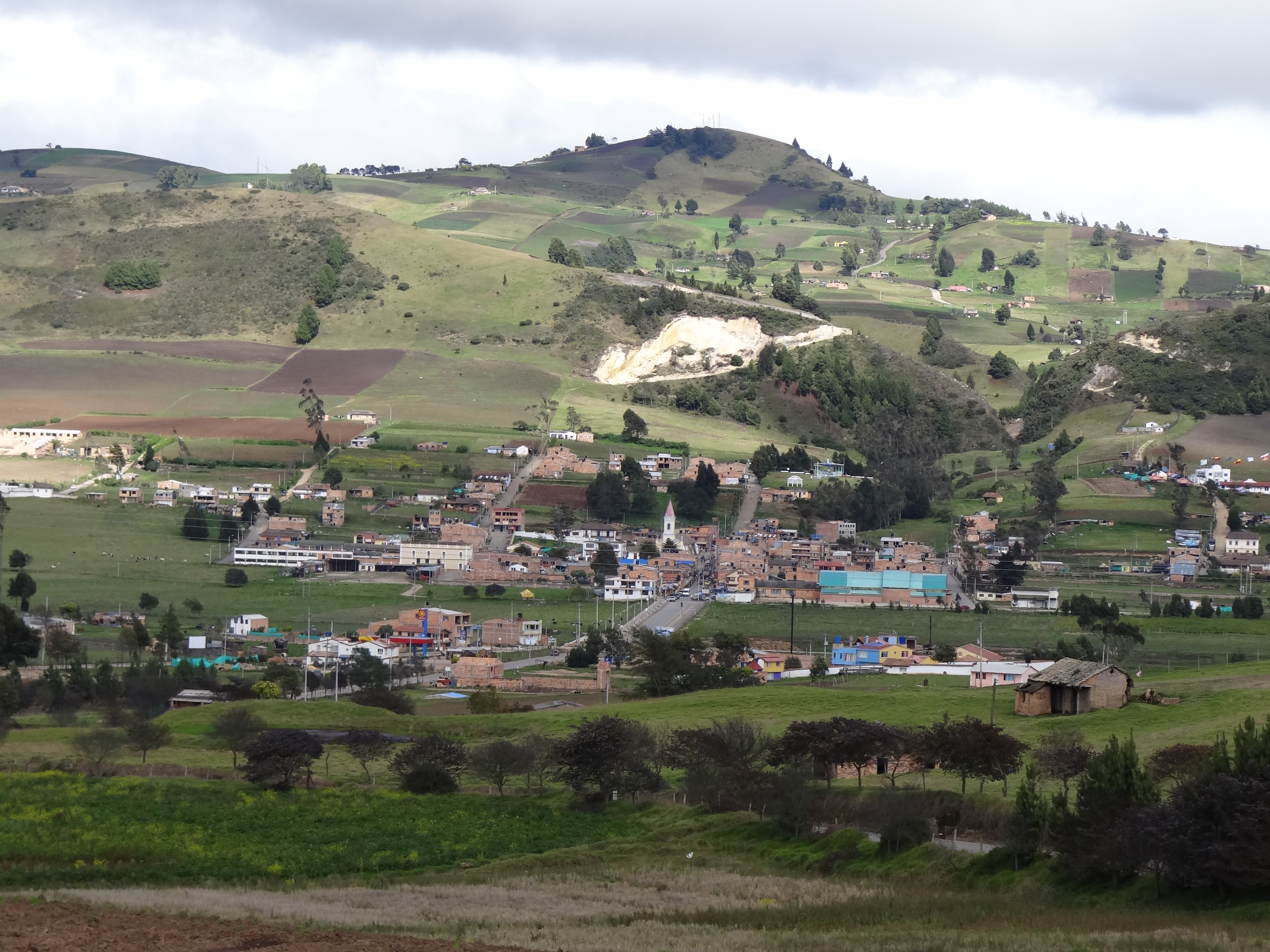
View of Soracá

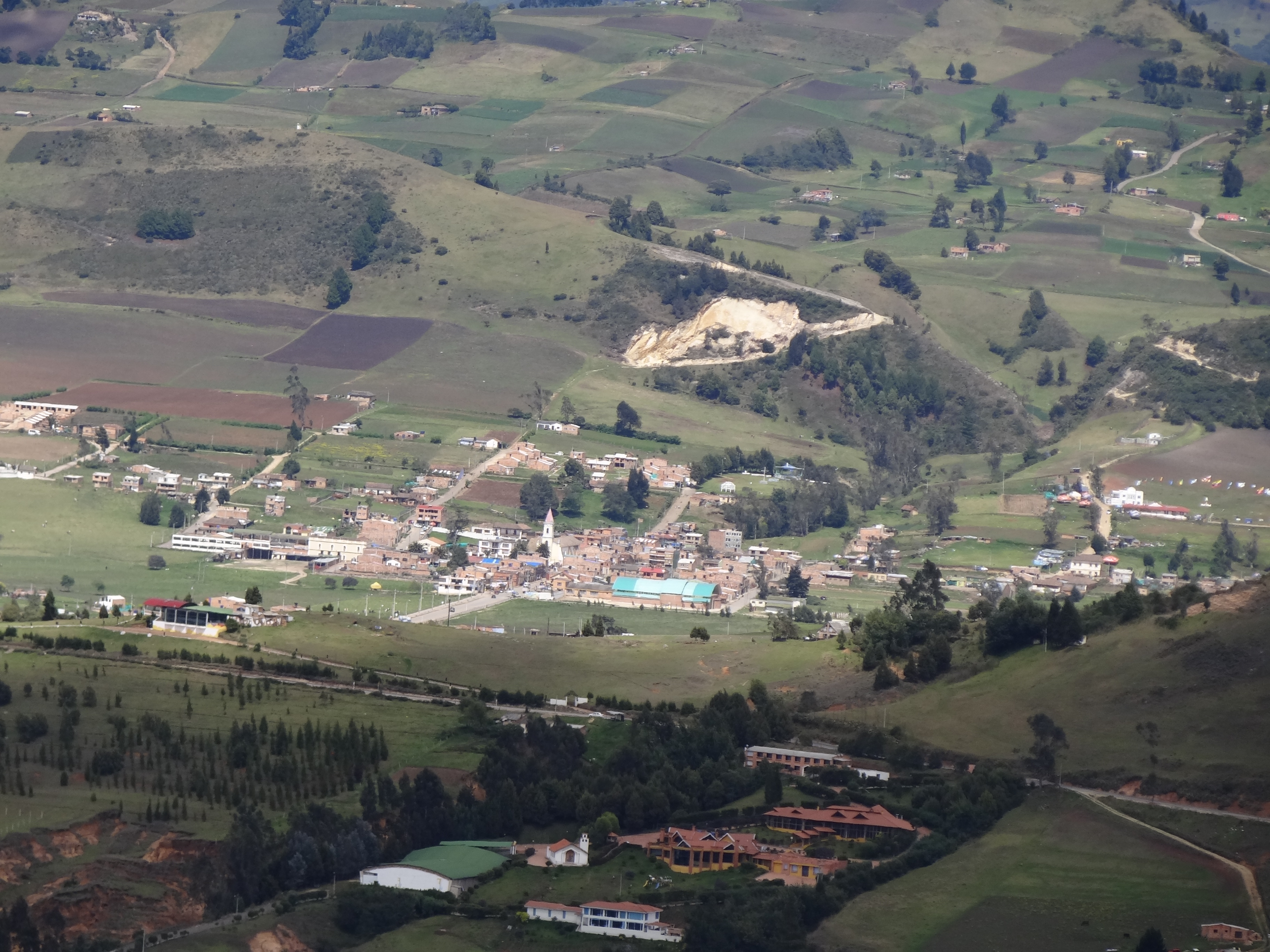
Soracá

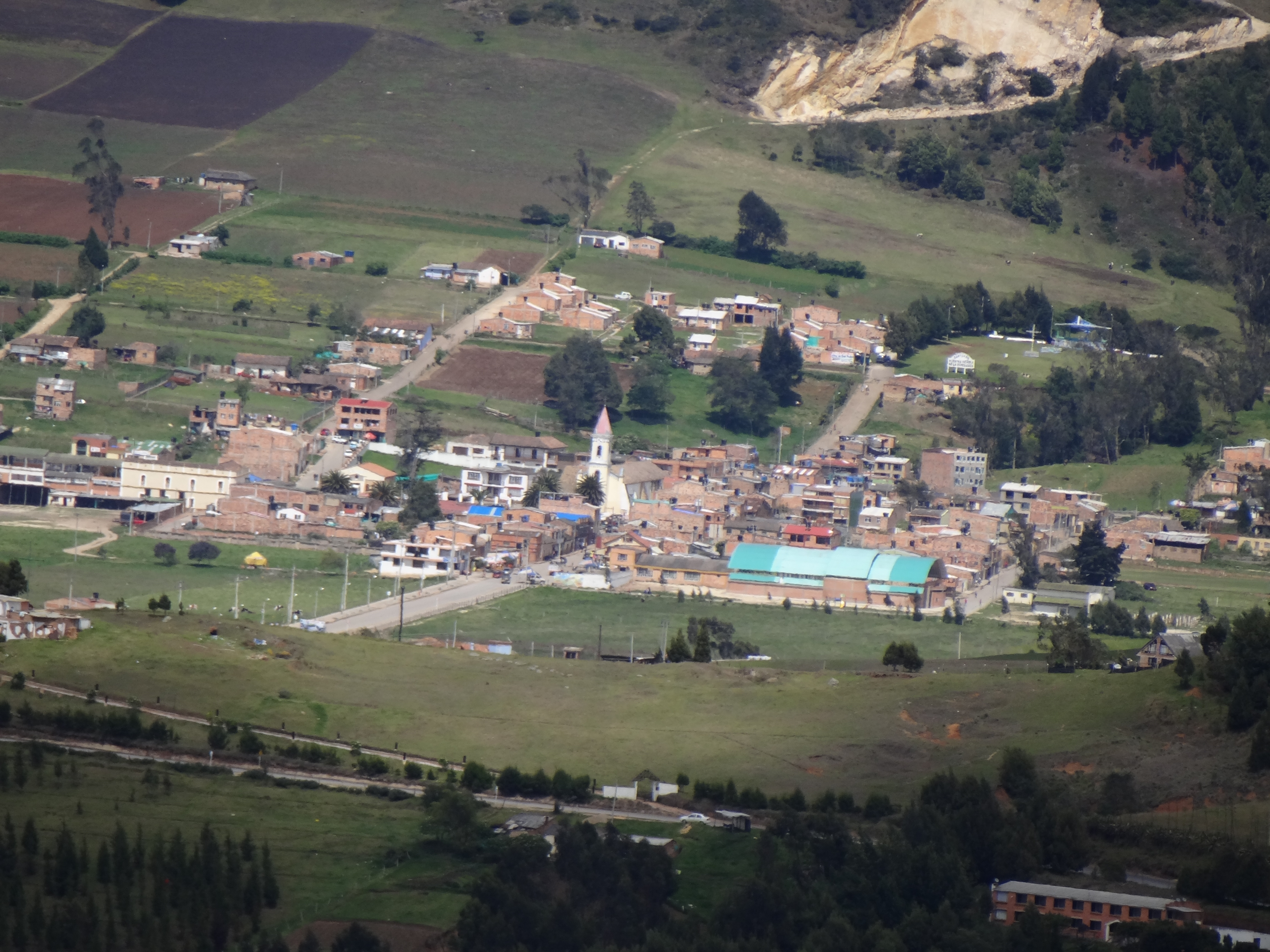
Soracá
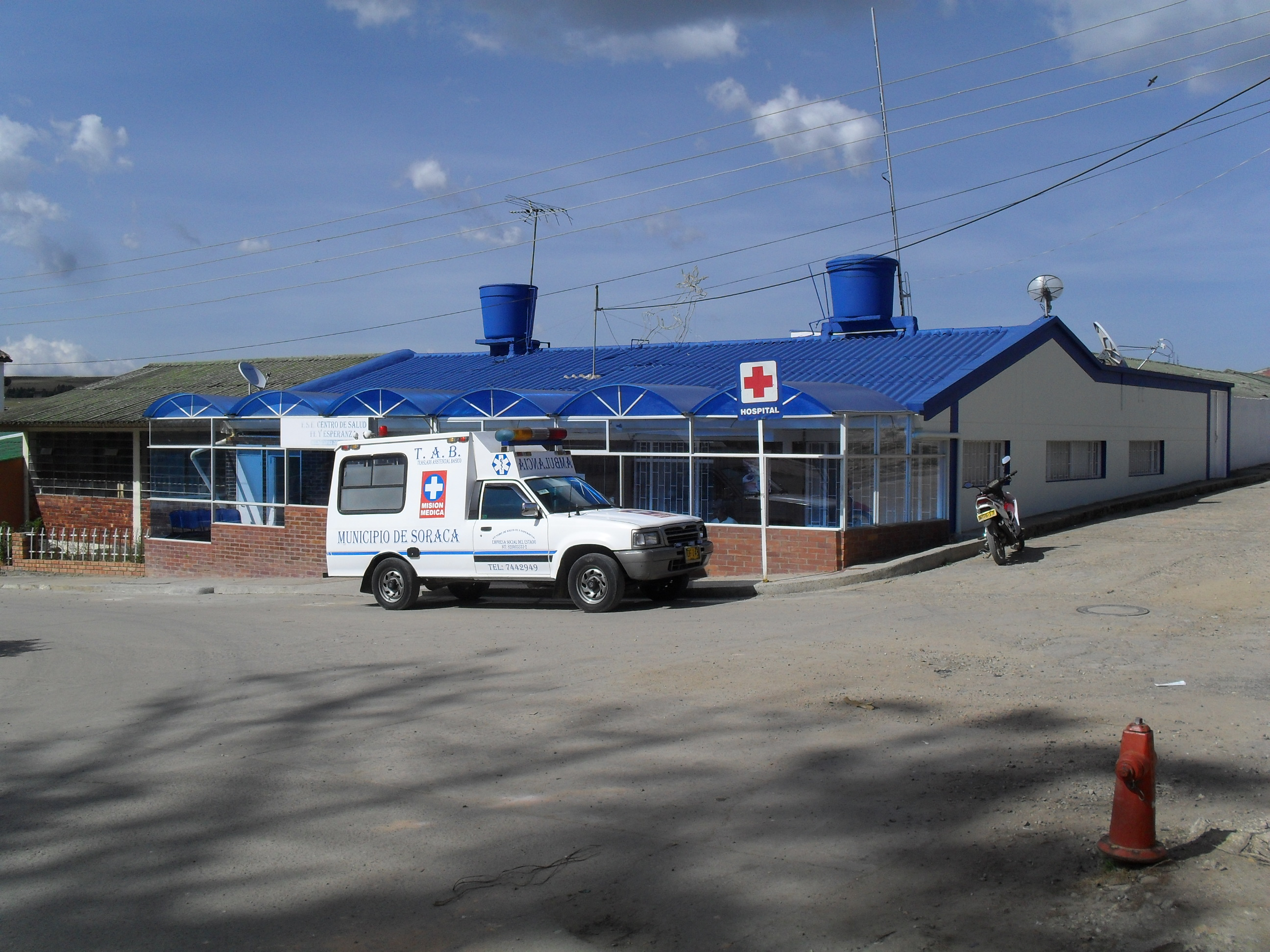
Medical center

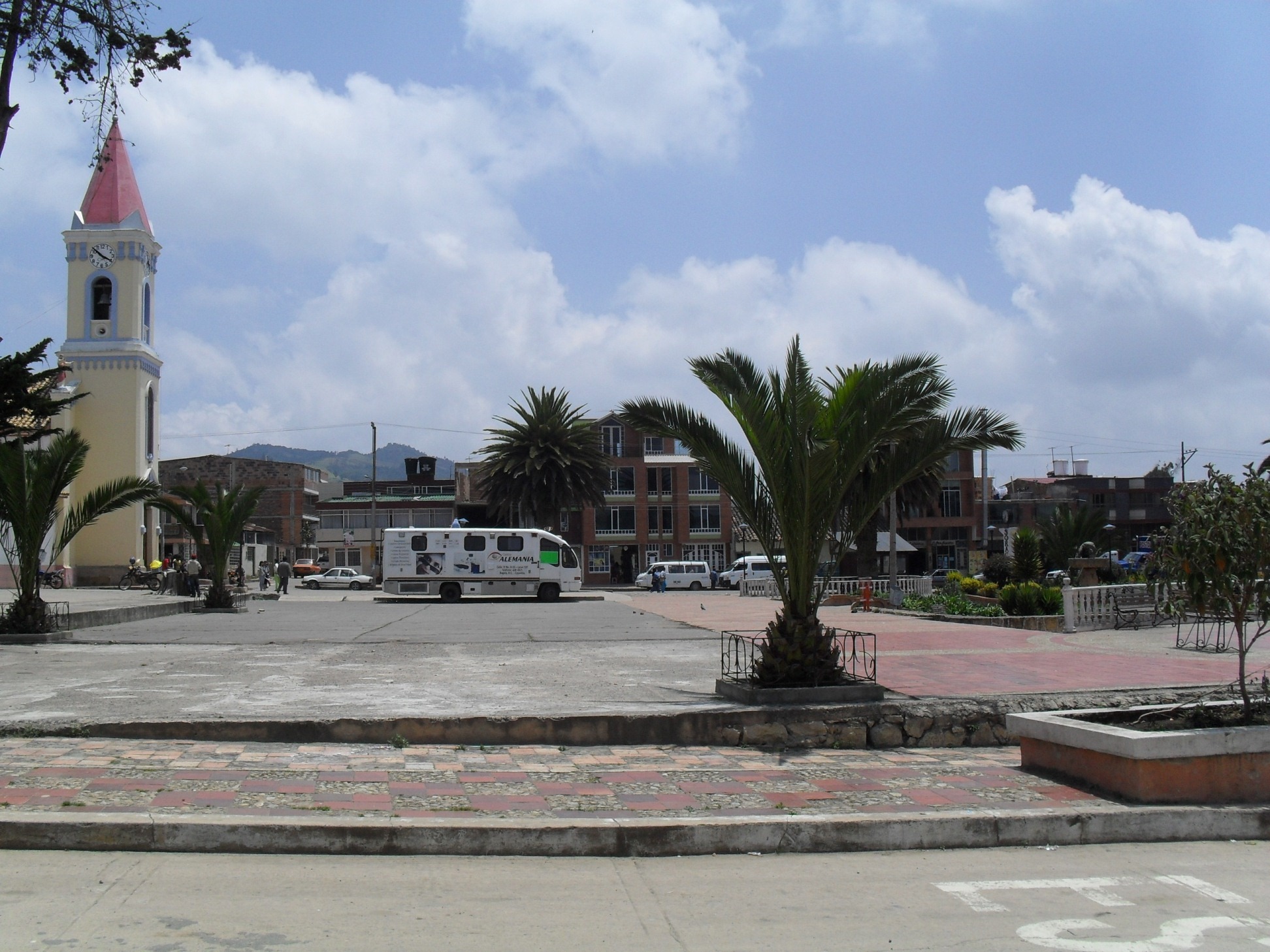
Central park

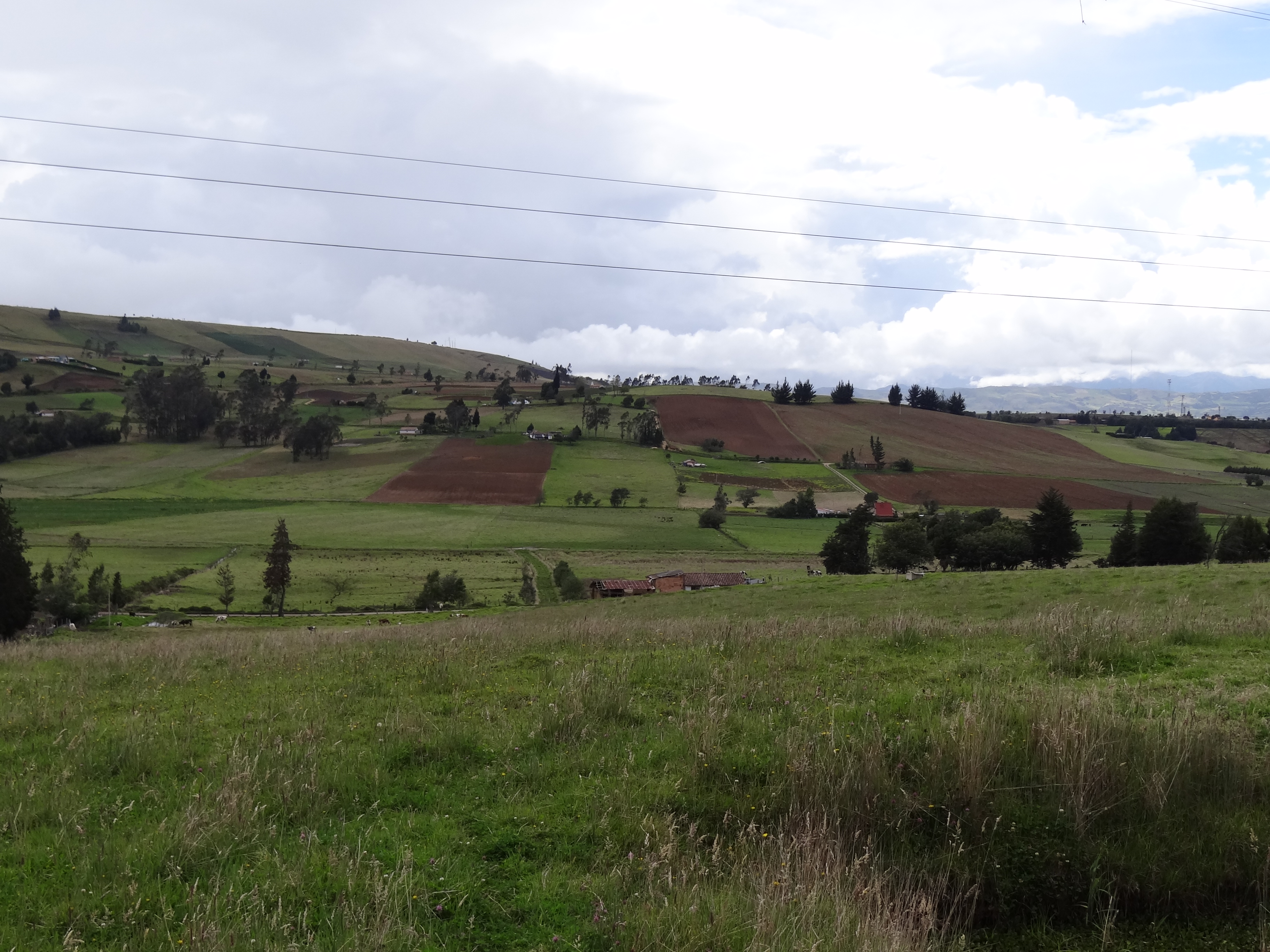
Rural part of Soracá
