= Thomagata =

Mythical cacique

Creature information
- Other name(s): Fomagata or Cacique Rabón
- Grouping: cacique
- Sub grouping: zaque
- Similar entities: Goranchacha; Tutazúa (brother)
- Folklore: Muisca mythology

Origin
- Country: Muisca Confederation
- Region: Altiplano Cundiboyacense; Colombia
- Habitat: Hunza

Thomagata or Fomagata was a mythical cacique who was said to have been zaque of Hunza, present-day Tunja, Colombia, then part of the Muisca Confederation. He is remembered as one of the most religious in the history of the zaques, after Idacansás.

== Background ==
In the centuries before the arrival of the Spanish conquistadors, the central highlands of Colombia were ruled by zaques (northern Muisca Confederation) and zipas (southern territories of the Muisca). The first confirmed human zaque and zipa were respectively Hunzahúa and Meicuchuca, inaugurated in 1450. The time before those rulers are based on Folklore.

== Mythography ==
Thomagata allegedly had a tail, as that of a jaguar that reached to the ground, hence the name Cacique Rabón ("Taily Chief"). Thomagata had four ears and only one eye because he was blind on the other.

Thomagata was a saint, traveling each night between Tunja and the Temple of the Sun in Sugamuxi along the Iraka Valley. His walks were a pilgrimage, ten times back and forth, praying in the sacred sites he encountered on his way. Muisca traditions tell he was so holy that whom he made angry, he converted into a snake, lizard or other animal. Thomagata got this ability from Idacansás and the Sun.

Thomagata looked upon his vassals with disrespect and turned them into animals, so the Muisca didn't dare look him in the face. Zaque Tomaghata never married.

Bishop Lucas Fernández de Piedrahita, chronicler of most of the Muisca mythology and traditions, wrote in the 17th century about Thomagata:

...habiéndose inclinado en su mocedad al matrimonio y queriéndolo efectuar, reconoció que estaba inhabilitado para ello porque desagradado el Sol de semejante pretensión y empeñado en que le sucediese en el reino Tutazúa, su hermano, lo despojó la noche antes de la potencia germinativa, por lo cual vivió toda la vida en celibato y después de ciento y tantos años murió...

translated as

...having tended towards marriage in his youth and wanting to carry that out, he recognized that he was unable for that because the Sun was too ambitious and determined that Tutazúa, his brother, would succeed the reign of the zacazgo ["kingdom"], [the Sun] deprived him from his genital power so he lived all his life in celibacy and after more than 100 years he died...

Tutazúa succeeded Thomagata as cacique of Hunza. In the Chibcha language Tutazúa means "son of the Sun". The first confirmed human zaque of the northern Muisca, Hunzahúa, is said to have descended from Thomagata.

=== Named after Thomagata ===
Thomagata Patera, a volcano on Jupiter's moon Io has been named after Thomagata.

== See also ==
- Muisca
- Muisca mythology, Idacansás
