= Muisca economy =

Aspect of indigenous Colombian culture

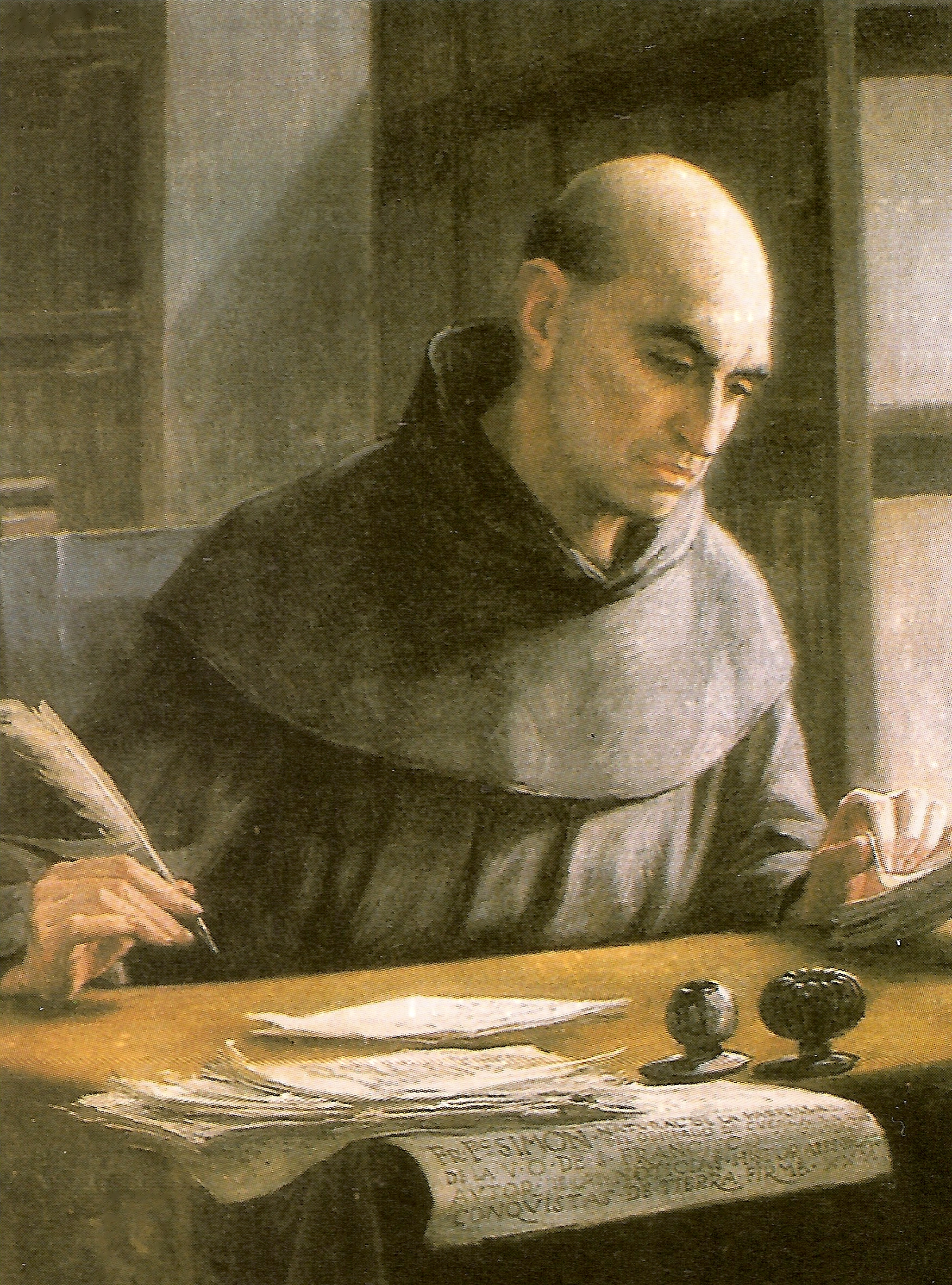
Early Spanish chronicler Pedro Simón.

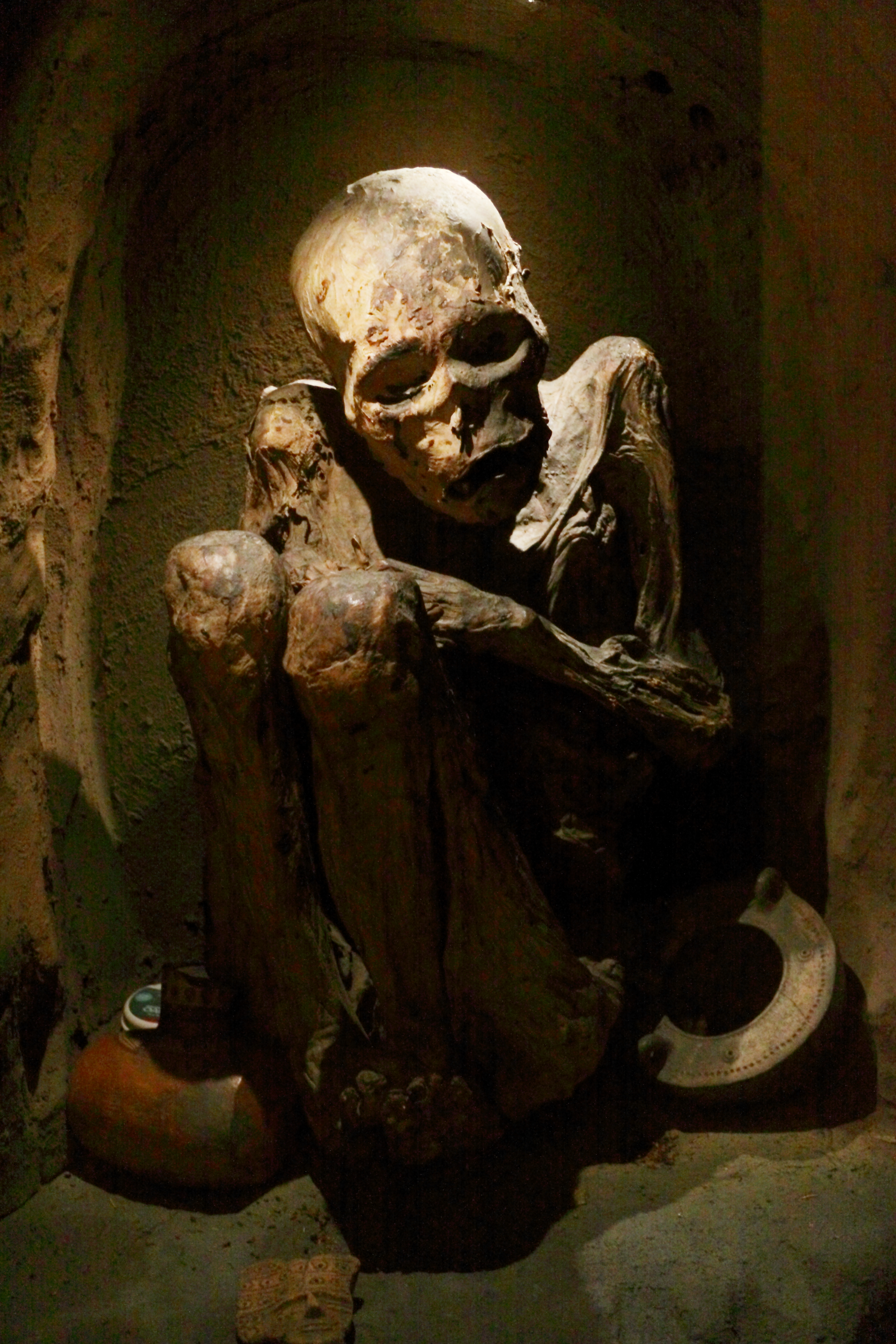
Muisca mummies were carried on the backs of the warriors during battles.

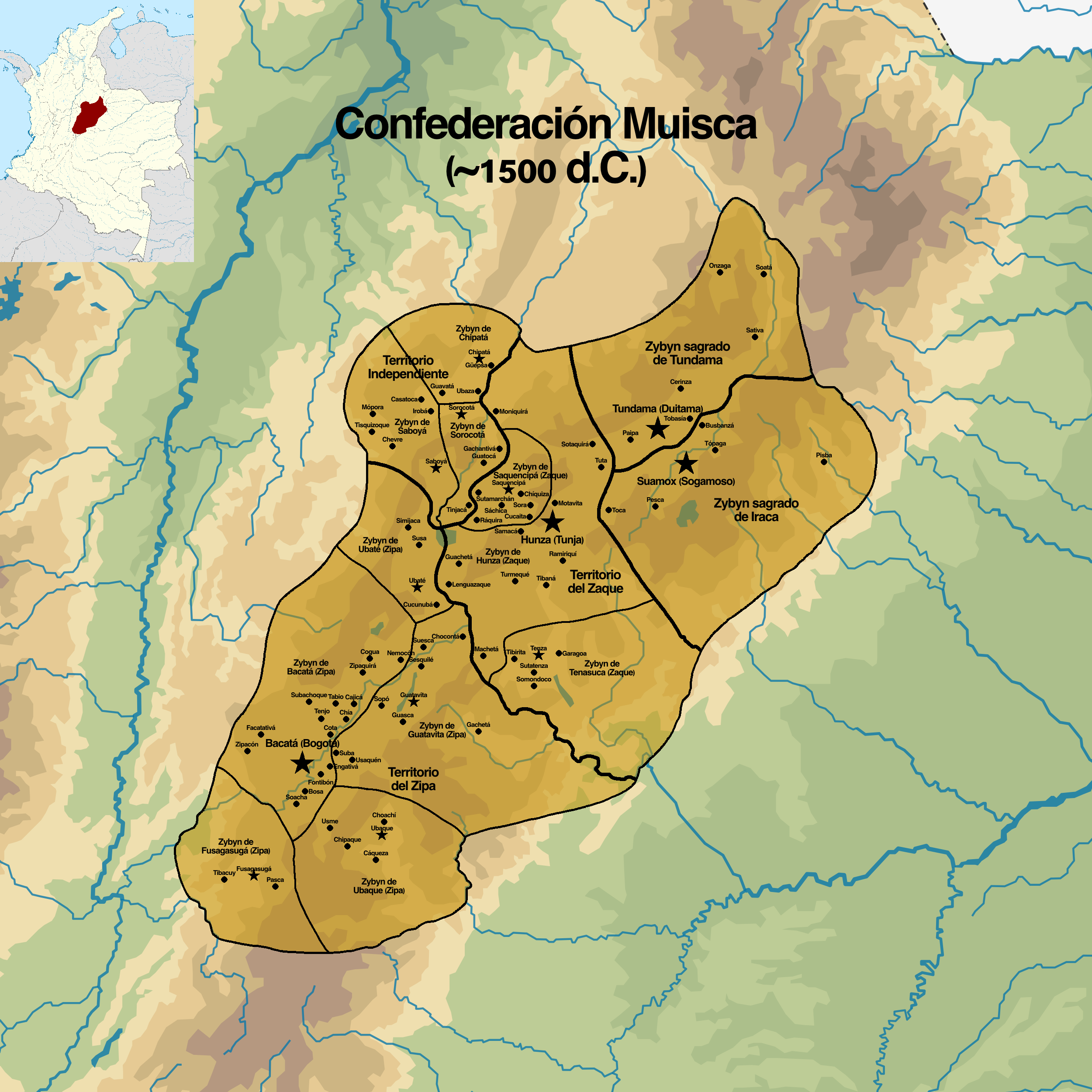
The four Muisca Confederations were confederations of Muisca chiefdoms predating the current departments of Cundinamarca and Boyacá.

The flat Bogotá savanna is the result of the Pleistocene Lake Humboldt. The fertile lacustrine soils mixed with volcanic ashes proved very advantageous to the Muisca agriculture

The economy of the muisca chiefdoms was marked by markets and autonomy of communities, as well as a system of exploitation of multiple North Andean eco-zones. Politically, the muisca chiefs or caciques had the function of redistributing an accumulated surplus of goods in a system of exchange called tamsa, erroneously translated as "tribute". Additionally, economic activity was also linked to political and religious activities associated with Chibchacum, god of merchants.

The Muisca economy was self-sufficient regarding the basic supplies, thanks to the advanced technologies of the agriculture on raised terraces by the people. Various pathways of goods existed throughout muisca territory, and markets were held in the cercados of chiefs, except in the territory of the Bogotá chiefdom. Chiefs participated in markets to show their prestige. Trade relations with other chibcha language-groups, like the Guane, were conducted without a muisca advantage. Exchange with other groups, not of the chibcha language family, was done to acquire luxury goods for chiefs, and wasn't conducted in cercados. Due to the absence of currency, the naming of places of trueque as "markets" has been criticized, however.

Apart from agriculture, the Muisca were well developed in the production of different crafts, using the raw materials traded with surrounding indigenous peoples. Famous are the golden and tumbaga objects made by the Muisca. Contrary to the writings of the colonial-era chroniclers, there was no uniform "currency" (neither so-called "tejuelos", "santillos" nor pearl necklaces), though blankets sometimes had an almost general value.

Mining was important for the Muisca, who were called "The Salt People" because of their salt mines in Zipaquirá, Nemocón and Tausa. Like their western neighbours, the Muzo -who were called "The Emerald People"- they mined emeralds in their territories, mainly in Somondoco. Carbon was found throughout the region of the Muisca in Eocene sediments and used for the fires for cooking and the production of salt and golden ornaments.

As the clear objective of the Spanish colonisers was to gain access to the rich mineral resources and the golden figures made by the Muisca, many primary accounts of the Muisca economy have been considered biased, misinterpreted or even outright false by later scholars. Pedro de Aguado, Pedro Simón, Juan de Castellanos, Juan de los Barrios, first conquistador Gonzalo Jiménez de Quesada and many others have written about the economy of the Muisca. Later research, in many cases nuancing or even refuting the scriptures of the early Spanish writers, has been conducted by Carl Henrik Langebaek, Marianne Cardale de Schrimpff, Sylvia Broadbent, Jorge Gamboa Mendoza, Javier Ocampo López and others.

== Background ==
In the times before the Spanish conquest of the Muisca, the central part of present-day Colombia; the Eastern Ranges of the Colombian Andes was inhabited by the Muisca who were organised in loose confederations of rulers. The central authorities of Bacatá in the south and Hunza in the north were the zipa and zaque respectively, the iraca priest in sacred City of the Sun Sugamuxi, the Tundama of Tundama and various other independent caciques (chiefs). The Muisca spoke muysccubun; "language of the people".

The Muisca were polytheistic and their religion and mythology was closely connected with the natural area they were inhabiting. They had a thorough understanding of astronomical parameters and developed a complex luni-solar calendar; the Muisca calendar. According to the calendar they had specific times for sowing, harvest and the organisation of festivals where they sang, danced and played music and drank their national drink chicha in great quantities.

The Muisca mummified the most respected members of their community and the mummies were not buried, yet displayed in their enclosures and carried on their backs during warfare to impress their enemies.

Their art is the most famous remnant of their culture, as living spaces, temples and other existing structures have been destroyed by the Spanish who colonised the Muisca territories. A primary example of their fine goldworking is the Muisca raft, together with more objects made of gold, tumbaga, ceramics and cotton displayed in the Museo del Oro in Bogotá, the ancient capital of the southern Muisca.

== Muisca economy ==
Accounts of the Spanish conquistadores show the Muisca had a highly advanced and specialised economy based on a variety of sources of income. The main foundation of their economy was the agricultural development using raised terraces on the fertile plains and valleys of the Altiplano Cundiboyacense. The caciques did not control the production directly although surpluses were distributed among them. Excavations at the archaeological site El Infiernito did not provide evidence of a power structure based on economical differences. Social complexity and advanced status of economies are often measured based on the specialisation in craft production. The specialised crafts form an economical advantage and sign of social prestige over competing communities. This has been theorised in the case of the Muisca economy, yet certain research restricted to the Bogotá area has found little evidence to support that thesis. Explanations for the lack of archaeological evidence on wealth differences and relations between higher social classes and wealth have been given in the form of methodological issues, ethnohistorical exaggerations by the Spanish looking for gold and sampling issues.

The biased views of the Spanish on the Muisca economy and other characteristics of the Muisca society have been noted by various scholars and in recent years a re-examination of those primary accounts has been conducted, among others by Jorge Gamboa Mendoza.

The Muisca had no particular trading advantage in interactions with other chibcha peoples. However, some colonial writers claimed they did, including Juan de los Barrios, who wrote that the Muisca men were traders (hipa in the Muisca language) and extremely able in such matters; "The Muisca were so sharp in their dealings that no other Indian could equal them in matters of such dazzling ingenuity". The early Spanish writers have reported that the Muisca paid tribute to other caciques. It has been suggested, for instance by Carl Henrik Langebaek, that those "tributes" were a misinterpretation of the Spanish. The Muisca verb "to give, to present" was zebquisca and the word for "to give" was zequasca, zemnisca or zequitusuca.

=== Redistributive system ===
The Muisca chiefs accumulated, through various means, an accumulated surplus that was not, contrary to colonial chronicler's claims, used for personal enrichment, but distributed during feasts on special occasions. This process, falsely translated as "tribute" by the Spanish authorities (in search of pre-hispanic equivalents to colonial-era tribute), was called tamsa, a word implying circulation of products from below to above and from above to below. This distributing role serves to maintain the chief's prestige and legitimacy, while establishing new relations. Similarly, the goodsstocked in the chief's houses were mainly used for religious purposes. This situation caused conflict between chiefs for prestige and legitimacy.

Feasts are organized for the re-construction of each individual's house, according to their means, but the main event of feasts, linked to the muisca agricultural calendar, was the construction of the chief's "enclosure", which can surround the entire settlement. Other occasions for tamsa were other religious ceremonies (besides ritual construction) or war. This distributing function, however, was not institutionalized, and chiefs still profited from their role as temporary administrators of goods. Additionally, this system wasn't reciprocal, as reciprocity was only practiced between members of the elite.

=== Micro-verticality ===
Similarly to other regions of pre-hispanic South America, muisca households exploit various eco-zones, a system named "micro-verticality" by Carl Henrik Langebaek, the same name used for Ecuador's pre-hispanic economy. This system, present at the level of domestic units and chiefdoms alike, makes muisca communities autonomous in terms of access to ressources. Many muisca households possess a secondary house to have autonomous access to various economic resources, by traveling relatively short distances. However, Langebaek considers his claims only as a "working hypothesis".

Colonial documents suggest various chiefdoms, among which that of Bogotá, had enclaves in the valley of Tena (where frosts are absent) to exploit its natural ressources. However, archaeological studies conducted in the valley suggest it was largely autonomous of foreign powers.

=== Agriculture ===
Muisca households generally possessed two houses: a permanent one and semi-permanent one, the latter (gueta) being used for agricultural purposes. Irrigation was not practiced in most of the territy (except in the Bogotá savanna), as the muiscas preferred dry agriculture. Agriculture was the main source of income for the Muisca who were generally self-sustaining due to the fertility of the soils of the Altiplano, especially on the Bogotá savanna. The fertility originates from the lake deposits, the result of the Pleistocene Lake Humboldt that existed until around 30,000 years BP and which remnants are still visible today; the various lakes and wetlands (humedales) of the Altiplano. Other prehistorical and historical lakes were present in the other valleys of the high plateau; the Ubaté-Chiquinquirá Valley, Iraka Valley and the Tenza Valley. When the lakes dried up, they left leveled fertile soils which were used by the Muisca to cultivate a large variety of crops, mainly maize, tubers, beans. quinoa and potatoes. The fertility of the Bogotá savanna was enhanced by the deposition of Neogene volcanic ashes. Fruits were cultivated in Somondoco and Subachoque. The highest population density was related to the richest agricultural lands, mainly on the Bogotá savanna.

To ensure a subsistence economy, the Muisca irrigated their lands and varied their cultivation over different climatic zones. The geography of the area allowed for micro-ecological regions providing farmlands on the fertile plains and in higher altitude terrains such as mountain slopes. Quinoa and potatoes (Solanum tuberosum) were cultivated on the highest altitudes, maize and coca in the temperate regions and yuca, arracacha, pineapples, tobacco and cotton in the low-lying valleys with a warmer climate. Additionally, Cucurbita maxima, Oxalis tuberosa (oca), peppers and Ullucus tuberosus were cultivated by the Muisca. The surplus of the agricultural production was available for trading on the many markets throughout the Muisca territories.

In the northern areas of Vélez, Surubá and Hunza, the topographical variability allowed for the cultivation of cotton and yuca and later sugarcane. The dramatic variations in temperature and rainfall together with the irrigation from the rivers Suárez, Chicamocha, Opón and Carare provided a sophisticated and diverse economic system. Irrigation canals and raised terraces were built throughout the area, important ones in Facatativá, Chocontá, Tocancipá and Tunja.

The favourable climate of the lower altitude areas, such as the Valley of Tena, allowed for two maize harvests a year, while on the cooler Bogotá savanna only one harvest per year was possible.

=== Hunting and fishing ===
The Muisca obtained most of their meat and fish by hunting and fishing. The many rivers and lakes on the Altiplano provided rich resources in fish, especially the lakes Fúquene and Tota. Hunting and fishing were activities performed by the Muisca men, while the Muisca women cared for the sowing, cloth production and ceramics elaboration. Domestication of guinea pigs started already in the Herrera Period around 500 BCE. Evidence for this has been discovered at Tequendama IV among other sites.

=== Mining ===
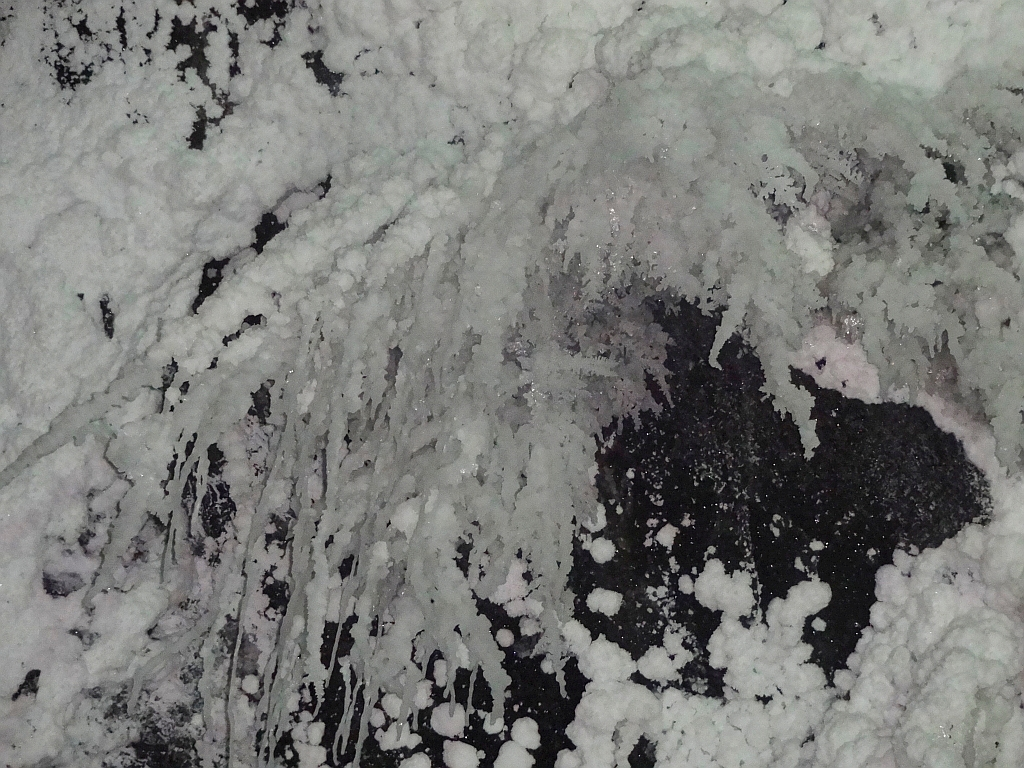
Salt was mined in Nemocón, Tausa and Zipaquirá, giving the Muisca the name "The Salt People"

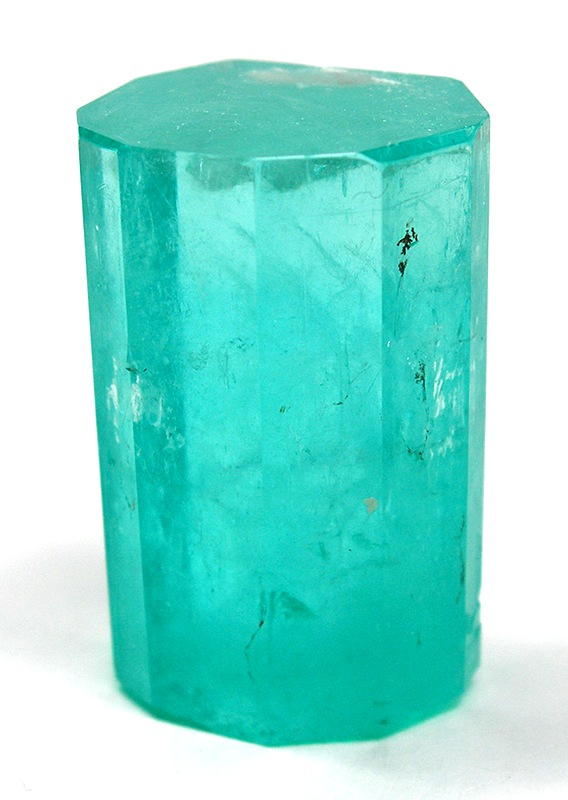
Emeralds were exploited using pits dug next to the formation. Because the emeralds from Somondoco were in sedimentary rocks, they would wash clean into the pits during the rainy season

The territories of the Muisca contained rich mineral resources of various kinds. Salt was mainly extracted in Zipaquirá, Nemocón and Tausa with minor mining activity in Sesquilé, Gámeza, and Guachetá. Emeralds were mined in Somondoco, Coscuez and Ubalá. Carbon exploitation was executed in Sugamuxi, Tópaga and Gámeza. Copper mining took place in Gachantivá, Moniquirá and Sumapaz. Gold and silver deposits were not common in the Muisca area and mostly obtained through trade. The mining of emeralds was conducted using coas, long thick wooden poles. The people dug holes during the rainy seasons next to the emerald-containing rocks and the emeralds from sedimentary rocks would wash into the holes that dried up and provided the clean emeralds. Emeralds from veins in metamorphic rocks were excavated using sharp poles. Carbon was a common resource in the Muisca territory and was found mainly in the Bogotá and Guaduas Formations. The process of exploitation was similar to the emeralds, using pointed wooden sticks.

=== Production ===
Apart from agriculture and mining, production was an important economic activity of the Muisca. Raw materials for the production of golden and tumbaga objects, cotton cloths and ceramics were mostly traded with neighbouring indigenous groups, or the result of extraction within the "Muisca" territories, such as clays from the many rivers on the Altiplano. However, gold was mainly associated with religious offerings instead of chiefly prestige.

==== Ceramics ====
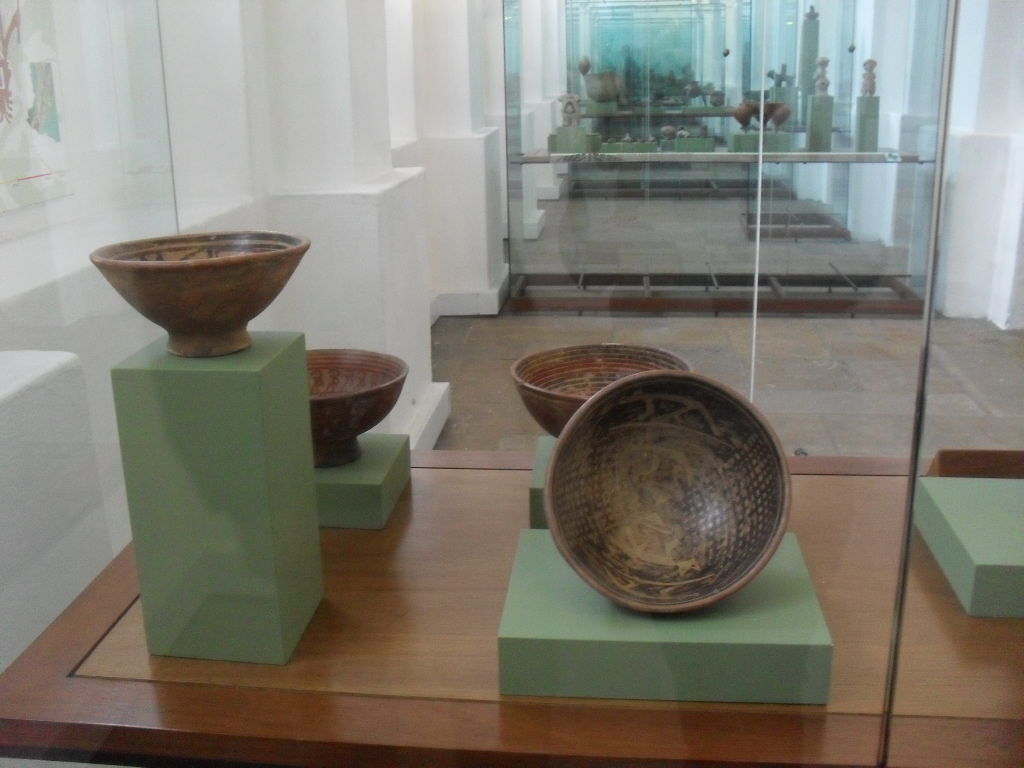
The ceramics of the Muisca were elaborated by the women. They were used for cooking, preparation of chicha and as trading materials with other indigenous groups

The Muisca were notable for their ceramics production and major production was located close to rivers and lakes. The surroundings of Lake Fúquene formed a principal place for ceramics production, especially in Ráquira and Tinjacá. The Spanish called the people from this region "Pottery People". Other important clay and ceramic producing settlements were Soacha, Cogua, Guatavita, Gachancipá and Tocancipá on the Bogotá savanna and Tutazá, Ráquira, Sutamarchán (Boyacá) and Guasca and Suesca to the north of the flat plains. The production of pottery was the task assigned to the Muisca women who produced various ceramics such as anthropomorphic vases, cups and mugs, the typical bowls called múcura, pans, the large pots for salt extraction (gacha) and jars with two, four or six holds. The pots were decorated with colourful paints and stylilised serpent or frog figures.

==== Goldworking ====
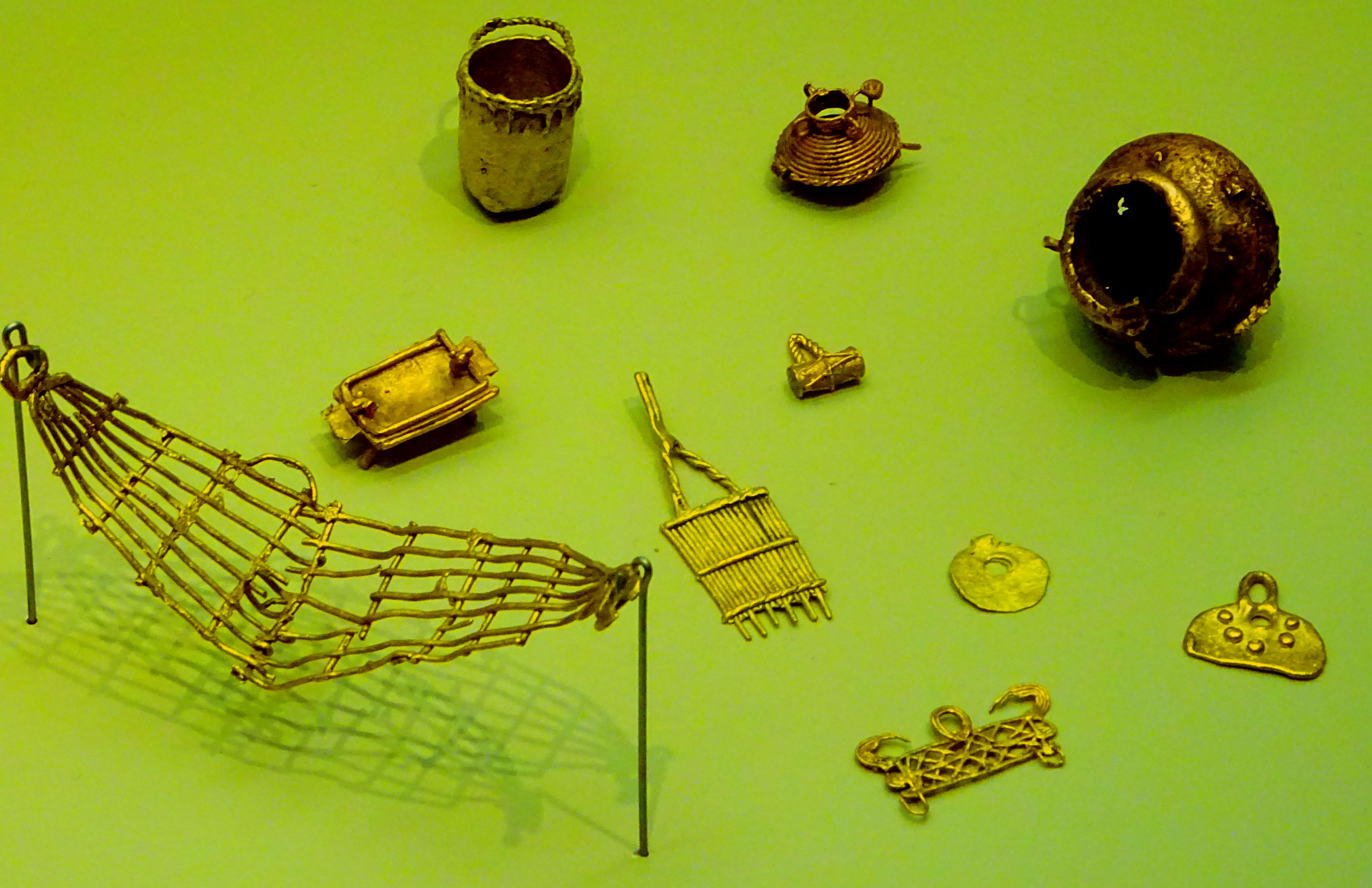
The Muisca are famous for the fine goldworking, here seen in different figures

The primary site for goldworking was Guatavita, close to the sacred lake which shares its name, Lake Guatavita. A range of objects was made of the precious minerals; crowns, nose rings, pectorals, earrings, diadems, tunjos (small anthropomorphic or zoomorphic offer pieces), brooches, scepters, coins (tejuelo) and tools. Access to gold offerings was extremely common and not monopolized.

To produce their objects, the people used melting pots, torches and ovens. The tumbaga was poured into heated stone moulds filled with beeswax to elaborate the desired figures. The heat would melt the wax and leave space for the gold to replace it. The advanced techniques produced highly stylilised figures. Associated with religious offerings and often brought to lakes or caves, gold was not the principal object of prestige among chiefs.

==== Weaving ====
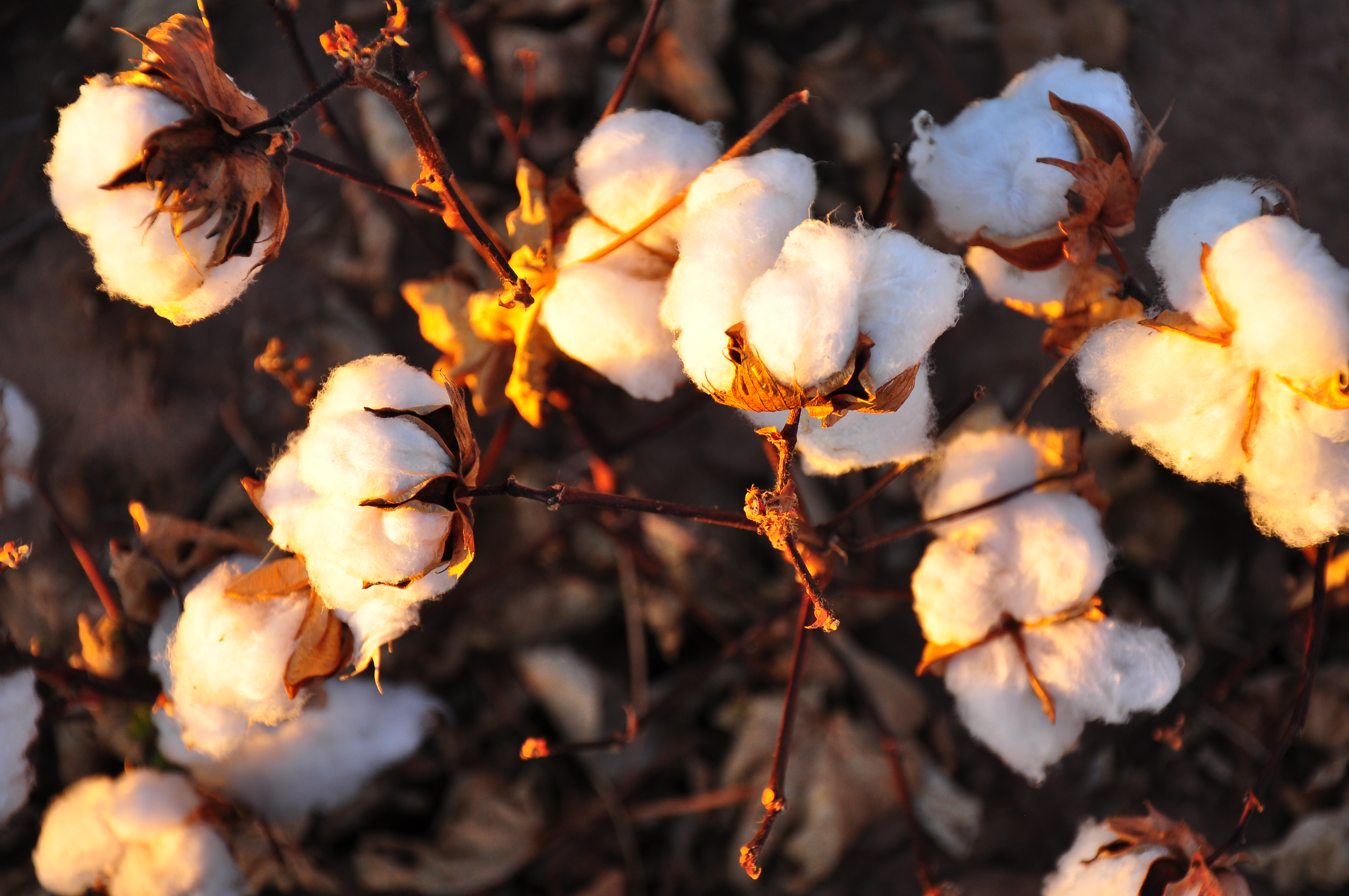
Cotton was an important raw product for the Muisca, grown in the lower altitude areas. The women wove mantles, bags, small cloths serving as money and nets from it

The weaving was performed by the women and used the cotton cultivated in the warmer climates, traded for salt or ceramics. Wooden spindles and clay rolls were used to perform the weaving of braided or tied cloths and mantles. Also nets were made of cotton. Needles were made of gold or bone. The cloths were painted black, red and other colours with clay rollers and pencils. As paint the Muisca women used indigo, woodlice (purple), saffron (gold), plants of the acanthus family and Bocconia frutescens (orange) and other natural inks.

=== Trade ===
Early chronicler Juan de Castellanos noted that the Muisca were "more traders than fighters". Trading was performed using salt, small cotton cloths and larger mantles and ceramics as barter trade. Also, colonial-era writers claimed that flat dishes made of gold were used as coins, called tejuelo: plain round disks of 1 centimetre (0.39 in), 4 centimetres (1.6 in) or 5 centimetres (2.0 in) diameter. The existence of any hypothetical "currency" has been refuted by Carl Henrik Langebaek, however. Langebaek argues, still, for the existence of regular markets in muisca terrtiory, based on cololnial documentation. The naming of muisca pre-hispanic "markets" by Langebaek has been criticized by Camilo Barrios, whose definition of market includes the presence of a currency, absent among the muisca. To Barrios, the "markets" are simply gatherings for trueque. Similarly, Langebaek has argued for a centre-perphery relationship between the muisca and neighbouring chibchan groups, while Camilo Barrios considers the Muiscas and their neigbourghs to have been generally equal in trade relations.

Important markets were held in various areas of the muisca territory. The largest muisca chiefdom at the moment of the arrival of the Spaniards, Bacatá, did not, however, have markets, differently from the other muisca chiefdoms and confederations. According to Pedro Simón, the Muisca held markets every eight days. Sorocotá, along the Suárez River was a major market town for trade with the Guane where gold from Girón and the Carare River area was traded for emeralds from Somondoco. Also tropical fruits that didn't grow on the high plateau in the Andes were sold here. The town of La Tora, present-day Barrancabermeja, was important for trade with the Caribbean coast and the major source for the highly regarded marine snail shells, elaborated with gold by the Tairona. Exchange with non-chibchan groups was not conducted in chiefly cercados, but in certain, agreed places.

Trade with the lowland people of the Llanos Orientales happened along trade routes across the Eastern Ranges. The crossings over rivers were made with ropes. Products as yopo, bee wax and honey, cotton, fish and fruits were traded with the Llanos peoples Guayupe, Achagua and Tegua. Also the precious colourful feathers of exotic birds, used for the Muisca crowns were traded with the Llanos, that provided animal skins such as jaguars for the hats of the caciques as well. While archaeological evidence suggests the trade was mainly inside the Muisca terrain, the low preservation degree of certain objects may well have biased that conclusion.

The cotton, important for the weaving of mantles both for clothing on the relatively cold Altiplano, came from northern and eastern regions. The northern circle of trade was centered around Sugamuxi and Tundama and the eastern trade dominated by the markets in Teusacá, Chocontá and Suesca. Coca trade concentrated in the north around Motavita and Chitagoto as well as Soatá. The merchants from Paipa would travel the 80 kilometres (50 mi) from the city to Soatá to buy coca which was sold again on the market in Tunja, 100 kilometres (62 mi) to the south.

At certain times according to the Muisca calendar, the people organised bigger markets during their festivities where people from farther away would come and trade their products. One of the most important of those ferias were held close to the banks of the Magdalena River, to the west of the Muisca territories in Panche and Muzo terrains. Here, gold and tropical fruits as avocadoes, guayabas, ice cream beans, star apples and various members (guanabana, chirimoya and others) of the Annona family were obtained, traded for mantles, emeralds and salt. Other big festivity markets were organised in Coyaima, on the banks of the Saldaña River and close to Neiva, area of the Pijao.

== Colonial period ==
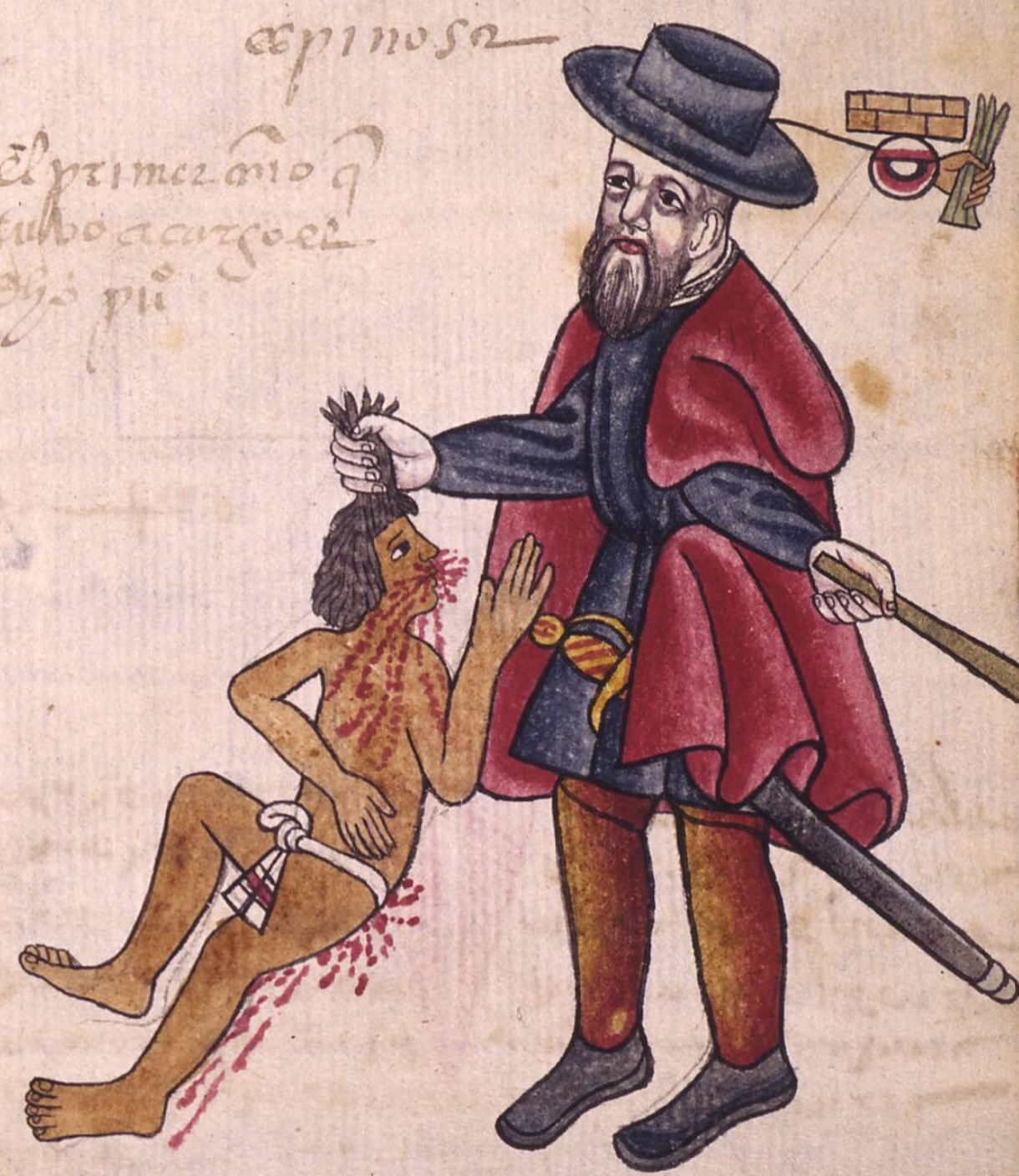
A Spanish encomendero abusing an indigenous American person

Soon after the arrival of the Spanish, a system of encomenderos was installed in the New Kingdom of Granada, as Colombia was called after 1537, where the caciques of the Muisca settlements were forced to pay tributes to the Spanish every six months. The previously self-sustaining economy was quickly transformed into intensive agriculture and mining that created a change in the landscape and culture of the Muisca. The indigenous inhabitants were forced to work the farmlands and mines for the Spanish, who imported slaves from Africa in addition to the Muisca labour. The European settlers used the Muisca economy, where gold was exchanged for cotton, salt, emeralds, mantles and other products to avoid paying the quinta real tax to the Spanish crown, which was based on gold. Where the first settlers required the Muisca chiefs to pay their tributes to the new reign in gold, later payments were done using the replacement products that were then changed to gold at the markets of Pamplona and Mariquita. In 1558, 20 years after the victory of the Spanish conquistadores over the Muisca, a letter to the Spanish crown revealed that more than 11,000 pesos were lost per year in evaded tax payments due to the system of trade via other products than gold.

== Modern age ==
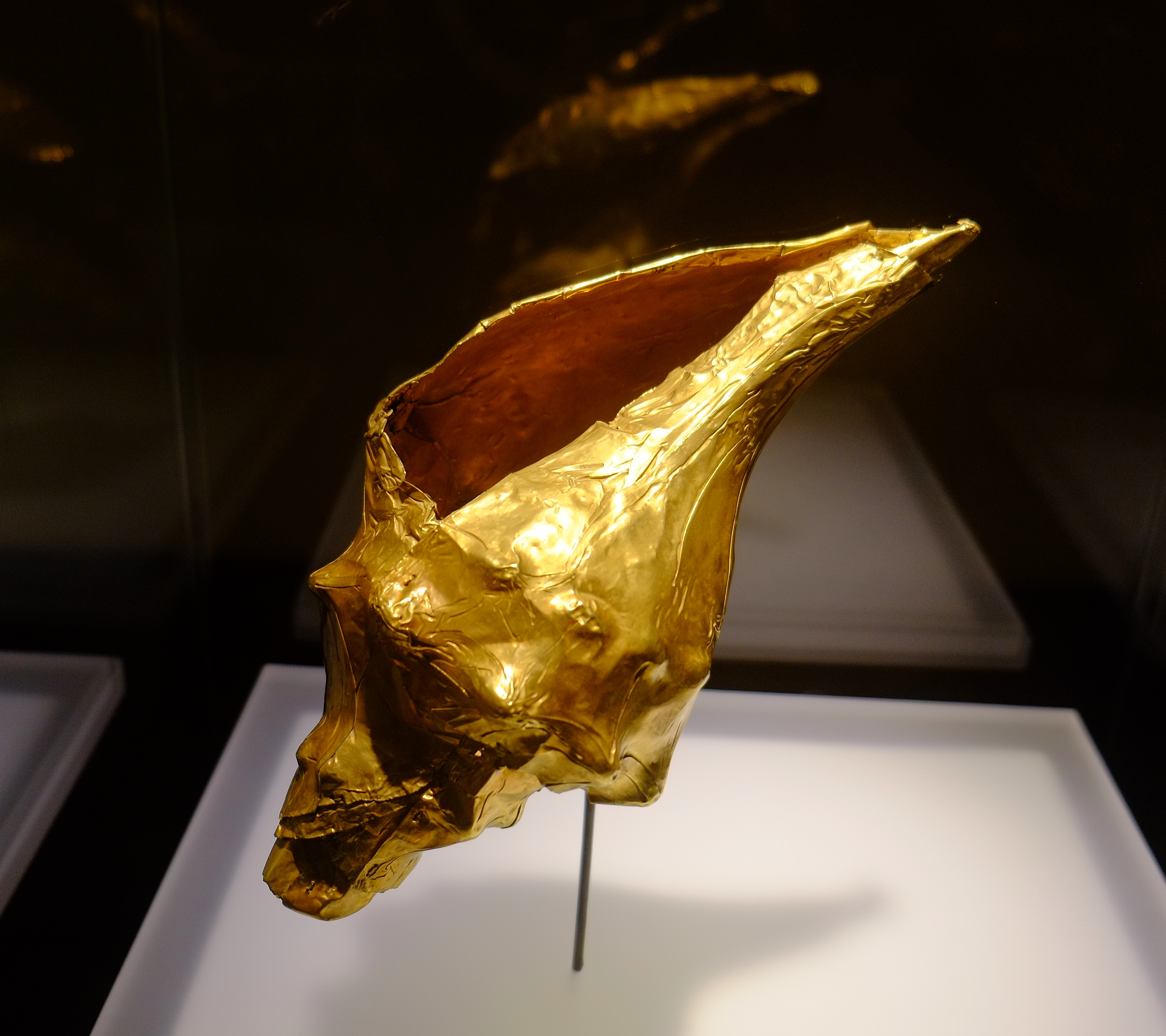
Golden sea snail in the collection of the Museo del Oro in Bogotá. The Muisca obtained the precious sea snails from the Tairona at markets to the north of their territories, e.g. in Barrancabermeja

Remaining of the Muisca economy in the present are the many markets throughout central Colombia, the emerald mining (Colombia is the most productive country worldwide of the green beryl gemstone, producing 70–90% of their finest quality ones) and the elaboration of cloths and pottery. Collection of Muisca economical products are displayed in the Gold Museum in Bogotá, the Archaeology museum of Sogamoso, the Colombian National Museum and other smaller museums on the Altiplano.

== See also ==
- Muisca
- Muisca agriculture
- Maya economy
- Aztec, Inca economy
