= Hunzahúa =

- zaque
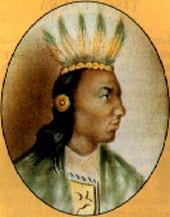
- Hunzahúa, first ruler of Hunza
- Reign: ?-1470
- Predecessor: Goranchacha
- Successor: Michuá
- Born: unknown Muisca Confederation
- Died: unknown Muisca Confederation
- Consort: Noncetá (sister)
- Dynasty: Hunza
- Mother: Faravita

Hunzahúa was the first zaque; ruler of the northern Muisca with capital Hunza, named after him. His contemporary zipa of the southern Muisca was Meicuchuca.

== Biography ==
Hunzahúa, heir of Idacansás, was a cacique in the sacred valley of the iraca and was chosen by the other caciques of the region to make peace between the battling parties. He became the first zaque of the northern Muisca region based in Hunza, present-day Tunja, and one of his policies was the ban on the use of weapons. According to Muisca scholar Javier Ocampo López, who wrote extensively about the religion and mythology of the Muisca, his mother was named Faravita and his sister Noncetá. Legend tells that Hunzahúa fell in love with his older sister and made her his wife when he left Hunza for Chipatá. Faravita, the mother of the zaque, disagreed with the marriage of her two children and attacked the couple, spilling a bowl of chicha. This created the Hunzahúa Well. When Hunzahúa saw what his mother had done, and the Muisca protesting against his incest, he damned Hunza and the surrounding valley. Noncetá gave birth to her younger brother's son in Susa, but the young boy turned into a rock. The sad couple traveled further, to the Tequendama Falls. Here, they changed into two rocks at either side of the sacred waterfall.

The reign of the northern Muisca spread from the Chicamocha River to the area populated by the Sutagao around Fusagasugá and from the flatlands of San Juan to the border region with the Panche and Muzo, including the territories of Vélez. The previous unknown unity of the region permitted the conservation of the Chibcha language and Muisca religion and mythology. Peace was disturbed when the southern Muisca zipa Saguamanchica took up arms against the northern zaque Michuá, succeeding the rule of Hunzahúa in 1470.

=== Hunzahúa in Muisca history ===
History of the Muisca
Altiplano	Muisca	Art	Architecture	Astronomy	Cuisine	El Dorado	Subsistence	Women	Conquest

== See also ==
- Muisca rulers, history of Colombia, Hunzahúa Well
