= Goranchacha =

Mythical south American cacique

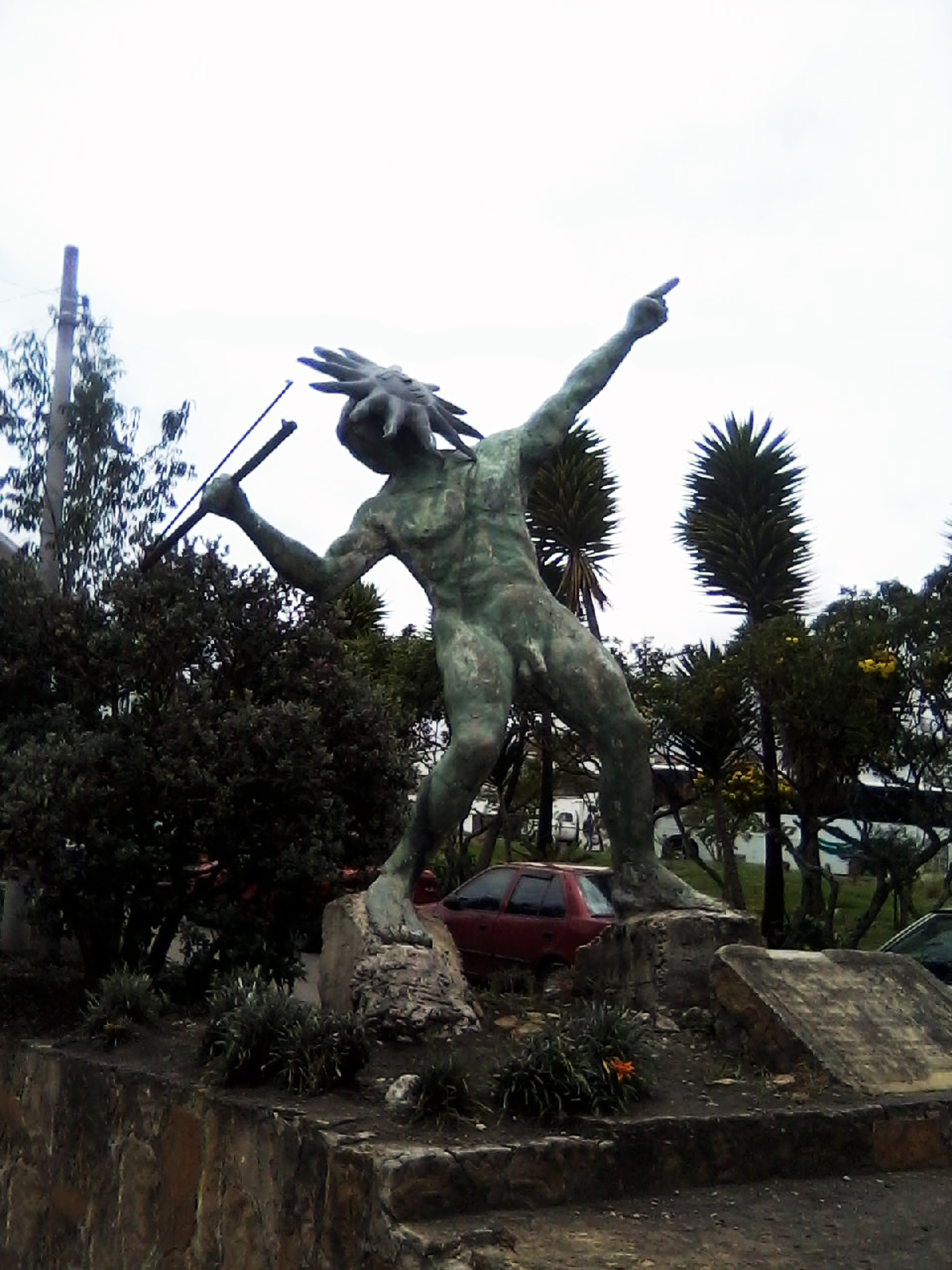
- Statue honouring Goranchacha; Universidad Pedagógica y Tecnológica de Colombia, Tunja

Creature information
- Other name: Son of the Sun
- Grouping: Cacique
- Sub grouping: Zaque Sué (god of the Sun) daughter of the cacique of Guachetá
- Folklore: Muisca mythology

Origin
- Country: Muisca Confederation
- Region: Altiplano Cundiboyacense; Colombia
- Details: Ramiriquí, Hunza

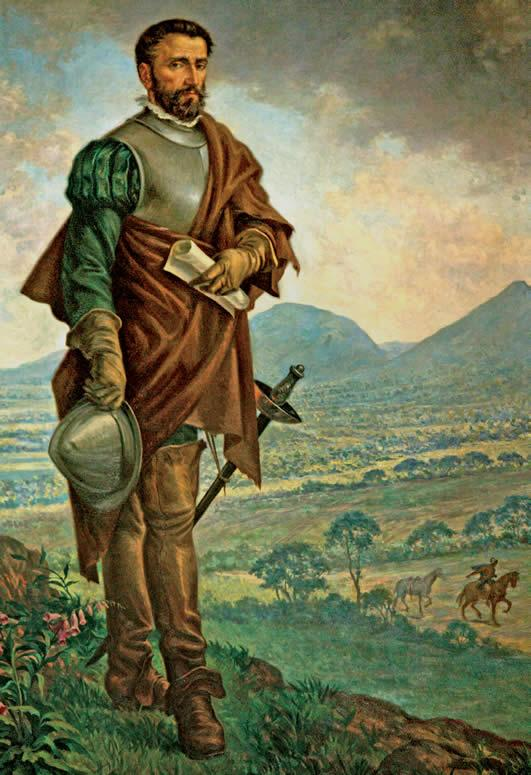
Gonzalo Jiménez de Quesada, prophesied by Goranchacha to submit the Muisca ferociously

Goranchacha was a mythical cacique who was said to have been the prophet of the Muisca of South America, in particular of the zacazgo of the northern Muisca Confederation. He is considered the son of the Sun, impersonated by the Sun god Sué.

== Background ==
In the centuries before the arrival of the Spanish conquistadores the central highlands of Colombia were ruled by zaques (northern Muisca Confederation) and zipas (southern territories). The Muisca had two main deities; Sué, the Sun, and his wife Chía, the goddess of the Moon.

== Mythography ==
According to the Muisca legends, the Sun wanted to reincarnate in human form and performed this via a maid of the village of Guachetá. The maid stayed a virgin because she gave birth after receiving rays of sunlight. This miracle became known in the village and the whole region around it. Upon this curious event, every day the daughters of the cacique of Guachetá left their bohíos (the Muisca houses) and climbed a hill to see the sun rising in the east.

They laid down naked under the Sun, waiting to be inseminated by the sunbeams. One of them became pregnant and after nine months bore a very large and pure emerald. The daughter of the cacique took the emerald and wrapped it in cloths to wear it between her breasts during a couple of days. Finally the emerald converted into a boy, who they named Goranchacha, son of the Sun.

On his 24th birthday, the son of the Sun decided to travel across the Muisca territories preaching the wise lessons of the messenger god and educator Bochica, which made him a prophet. In Ramiriquí, Sugamuxi, sacred city of the Sun, and in other villages Goranchacha was received as religious leader. When the leader of Ramiriquí, then capital of the northern Muisca, hurt one of his lovers, Goranchacha returned from his travels to the village, killed the leader and took over the throne. He selected a group of servants to his power. One of them was the town crier, an Indian with a long tail, who became the second-in-command of the city.

Goranchacha's rule was harsh and executed fierce punishments for small offenses. He moved the capital of the northern Muisca from Ramiriquí to Hunza where he became a real dictator. The people feared him and his punishments that consisted of tortures with prickly pear cactus leaves and after that severe beatings. According to chronicler Pedro Simón, Goranchacha did not want the people to talk to him and they were not allowed to look him in the face, as that was a sign of disrespect for his rule.

Like was present in Sugamuxi, Goranchacha ordered the construction of another Sun Temple in Hunza. For that he demanded materials would be brought from the farthest regions of his reign. On the location where the temple allegedly was constructed is currently the seat of the Universidad Pedagógica y Tecnológica de Colombia in Tunja. He used the temple to worship his father, the Sun and held parties in the temple often with human sacrifices. Goranchacha organised processions from other areas to the temple that took nine days, so three weeks; three days (1 week) of marching, one week of praying and one week of marching back. He ordered there would be giant columns of rock erected in front of the temple and the stones needed to be transported by the people at night (Chibcha: zasca). The columns were built in as phallic symbols.

Goranchacha's assistant, the Indian with a tail like a jaguar, helped him with all the activities. One day they gathered all the people ruled from Hunza and Goranchacha prophesied that one day strong and ferocious men would come who would make the people slaves, abuse them and make them work for them [the Spanish conquistadores]. Goranchacha told his people he would leave and return after a few years to see them again. He left but never returned. The jaguar-tailed Indian also left; he turned into smoke.

== See also ==
- Muisca mythology
- Idacansás
- Thomagata
