= Monster of Lake Tota =

Colombian mythological creature

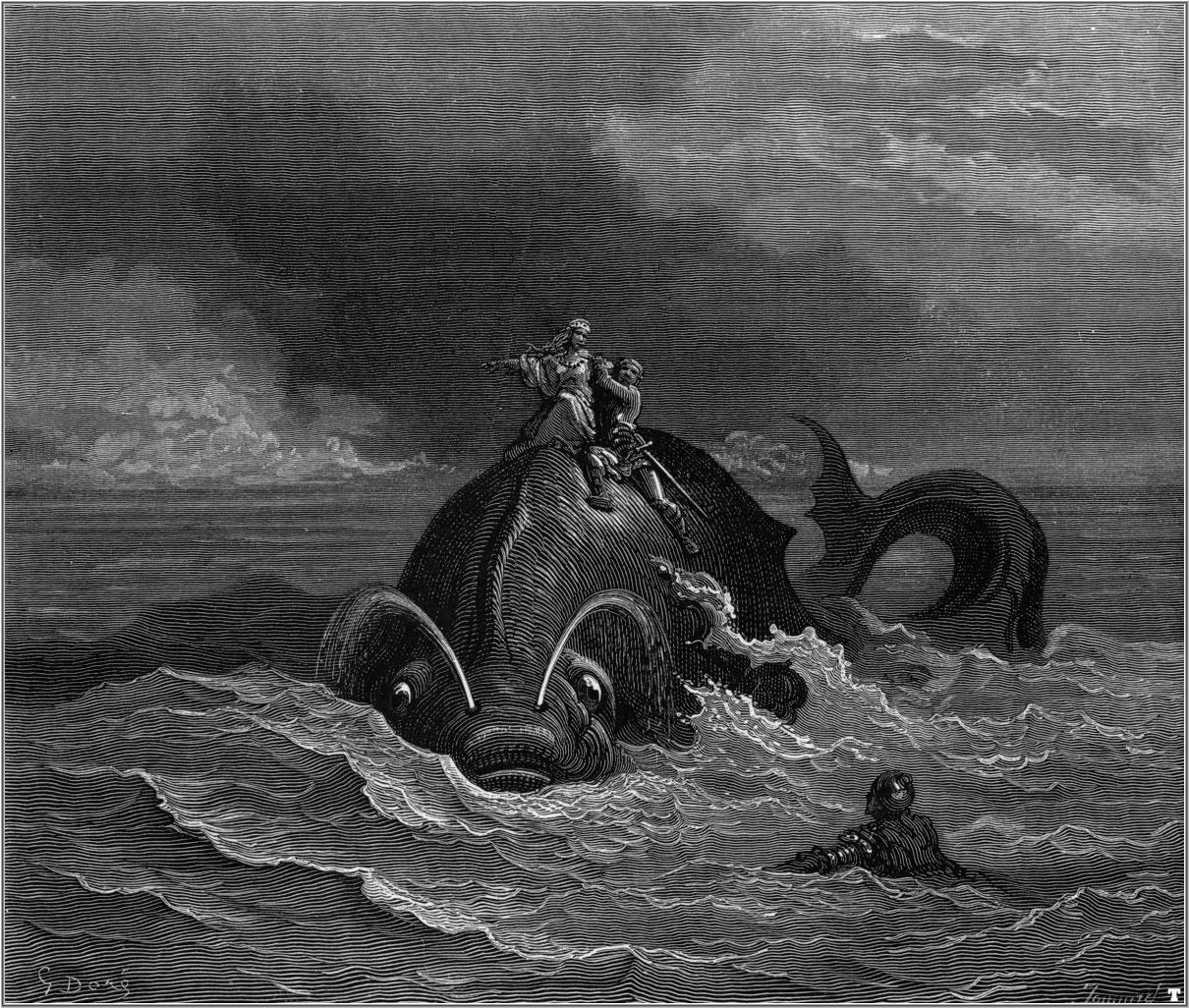
- Illustration of an aquatic animal by Gustave Doré
- Folklore: Muisca mythology
- Country: Muisca Confederation
- Region: Altiplano Cundiboyacense; Colombia
- Habitat: Lake Tota

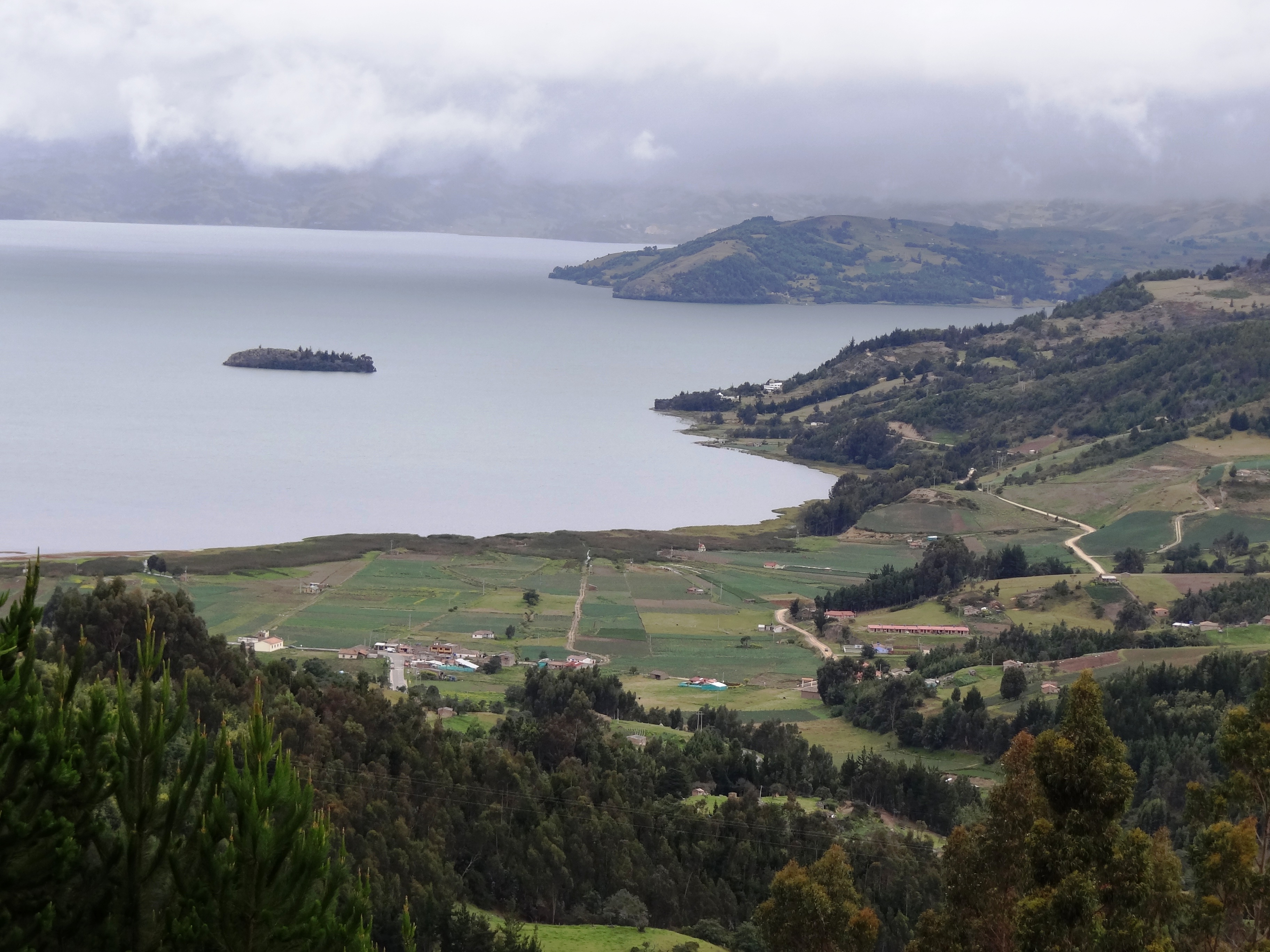
Lake Tota

The Monster of Lake Tota is a legendary aquatic animal known in many works as: diablo ballena, lit. 'devil whale'. The monster is an inhabitant of Lake Tota in present-day Colombia, according to the Muisca, who inhabited the Altiplano Cundiboyacense. The earliest reference in modern history was made by the conquistador Gonzalo Jiménez de Quesada. He described the monster as "A fish with a black head like an ox and larger than a whale" (Lucas Fernández de Piedrahita, 1676) and Antonio de Alcedo, 1788)). The monster was also defined as "a monstrous fish", "a black monster", and even as "the Dragon" and as a "divine animal archetype" (2012).

== Description ==
The description of the monster of Lake Tota is limited to historical references and what is known within the study of Muisca mythology. A report of an alleged sighting took place in 1652. The legend of the monster of Lake Tota also analyzed using cryptozoology with ties to cases such as the Loch Ness monster (Nessie) in Scotland, the monster of Lake Nahuel Huapi (Nahuelito) in Argentina, or "The Hide" of the Mapuche mythology in Argentina and Chile (a serpent monster made of various animal hides).

== Historical references ==
=== 17th century ===
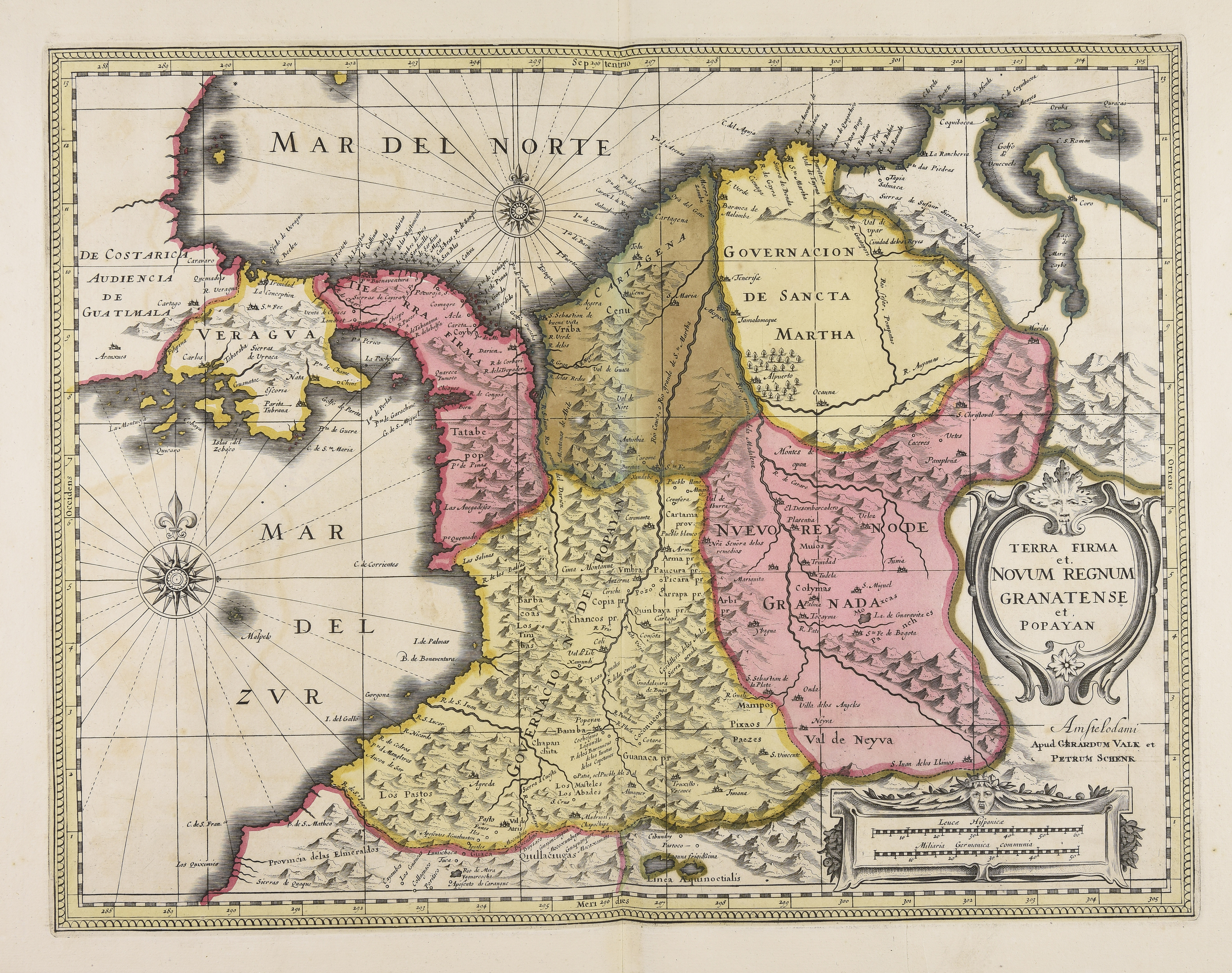
New Kingdom of GranadaGeneral History of the Conquest of the New Kingdom of Granada: the SCRM d. King Charles II of Spain and the Indies, by Lucas Fernández de Piedrahíta, August 12, 1676

==== Lucas Fernández de Piedrahita ====
In 1676 (August 12), the Colombian priest and historian Lucas Fernández de Piedrahita (Bogotá, 1624 - Panama, 1688), as requested by the Bishop of Santa Marta, presented his General History of the Conquest of the New Kingdom of Granada: the SCRM d. King Charles II of Spain and the Indies, in which Chapter I, paragraph 13, contains the following statements of a monstrous being on Lake Tota:

"Refer to it Lake Tota but calls it a Laguna in the text as a place in which a fish with a black head like an ox and larger than a whale was discovered.

When referring to a sighting, an additional citation brings certainty to the matter:

"Quesada says that in his time, trusted persons and the Indians affirmed that it was the devil; and for the year six hundred and fifty-two [1652], when I was at the place, Doña Andrea Vargas, lady of the country, spoke about having seen it.

=== 19th century ===
==== Gaspard Théodore Mollien ====
The French explorer and diplomat Gaspard Théodore Mollien (Paris, August 29, 1796 - Nice, June 28, 1872), recorded in his book The Journey of Gaspard Théodore Mollien by the Republic of Colombia in 1823, in Chapter V, the following:

When going to Iza I intended to visit Lake Tota, which is a little higher, but in the same direction.

I left Iza, a little before dawn; (...). Superstition has continued to inhabit these places concerning horrific wonders: indeed, the rugged look of the region; suspended waters, so to speak, and such a height to always be agitated by the wind blowing from Toxillo, the most elevated wetlands of lake Tota; a slimy substance, oval, and filled with unpleasant water like the sand of its beaches, everything tends to arouse surprise. According to the people in the region, the lake is not navigable; the evil character inhabits its depths in dwellings, they say, one can see the gateways if they stay away from the shores and head toward the middle of the lake, occasionally out of the abyss a monstrous fish can be seen only briefly.

Lake Tota forms an arc which ends in the Northwest and the Southeast; the temperature is very wet and cold; the water has a bluish color and is thick, unpleasant, and not very clean; like the sea the water of the lake is constantly agitated because of the storms that form in the Toxillo. In the middle of the lake are some islands; there has only been one man who has dared to go to them, the belief that the lake is enchanted prevents others from visiting them: the bottom of the lake seems to be composed of a silica sand. The mountains that surround it are composed of a thick sandstone, so strongly cemented that even the lowest areas aren’t affected by water filtration; however, one would assume that the thermal springs of Paipa and Iza are rooted in this vast reservoir that is located a few measures higher than the thermal springs.

==== Manuel Ancízar ====
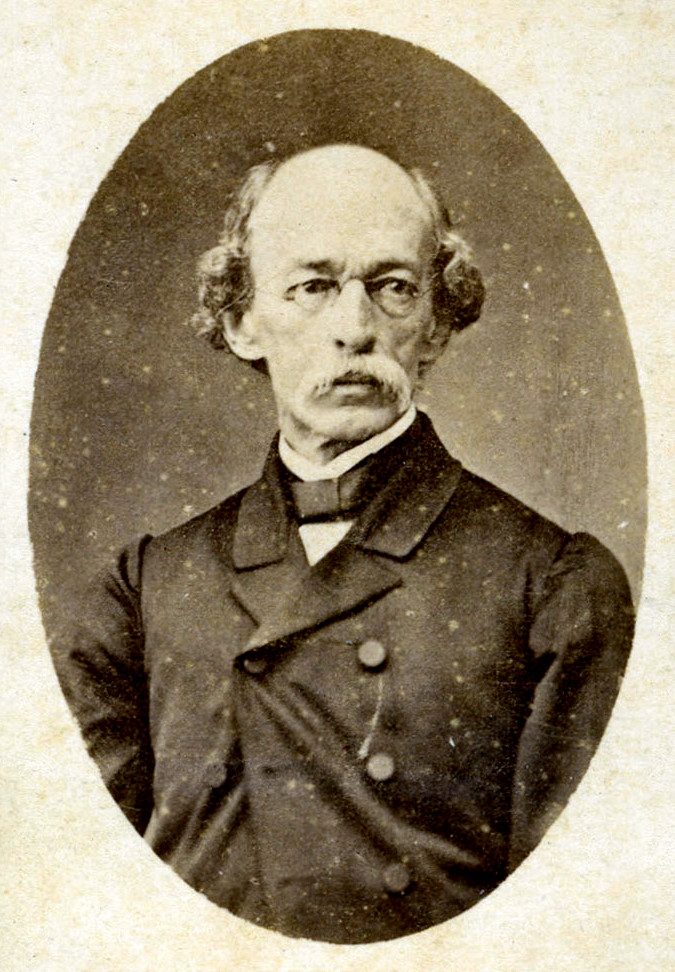
Manuel Ancízar (1812–1882)

In 1852, Colombian writer, politician, teacher and journalist Manuel Ancízar (Fontibon, December 25, 1812 - Bogota, May 21, 1882); within the works led by Agustin Codazzi, carried out the Corográfica Commission and recorded in his book The Pilgrimage Alpha for the northern provinces of New Granada in 1850-1851 (Alpha was the pseudonym of Ancízar), a reference to the diabloballena monster of Lake Tota that cited Piedrahita's General History of the Conquest of the New Kingdom of Granada: the SCRM d.King Charles II of Spain and the Indians, in Chapter XXIV, paragraph 5:

"This tall story involved the freshwater devil [in reference to "diablo ballena" quoted Piedrahita] and now no one has the courage to explore the lake, which had little islands that Piedrahita noted were even worse. Recently, an Englishman arrived who was not afraid of the devil, and manufactured a reed raft, went to the largest island which was peacefully possessed by … shy deer and there he held a bloody battle for the island. Following the example of the Englishman, other boaters arrived in rafts and canoes, occupying the islands and the lake and dispelling the spooky stories. Today, the only dangers are those caused by the storms of the Toquillo wetlands, when the three square areas of surface waters are agitated by windstorms."

In the end, Ancízar declared, without discrediting the monster referred to by Piedrahita or exposing any evidence, his doubts about the accuracy of the monster and began to raise his initiative to practice draining Lake Tota to increase the agricultural frontier. He ends the paragraph in reference by stating:

"Partial drains periodically deepening the channel of Upía, are the only practicable measures to promise success to those seeking land to work, no treasures, that seem just as certain to them as the diabloballena of Piedrahita.”

==== José Jerónimo Triana ====
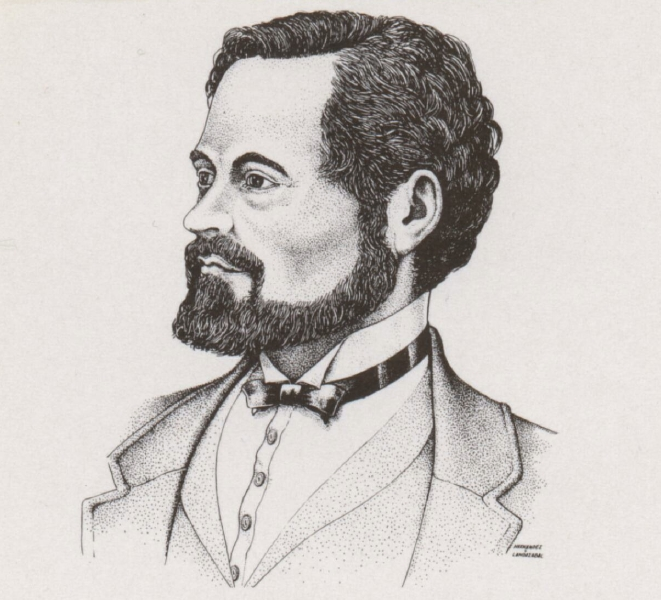
José Jerónimo Triana (1828–1890)

Meanwhile, Colombian botanist, explorer and physician José Jerónimo Triana (Bogota, May 22, 1828 - Paris, October 31, 1890), a member of the Corográfica Commission of Ancízar, also references the issue. A summary of the book Myths, legends, traditions and folklore of Lake Tota (Lilia Montaña de Silva, Edition La Rana y El Águila, UPTC Tunja, 1970, p. 46-47) states:

“[What I want to say, comments Triana, with respect to the lakes and lagoons, is that they were the main shrines of the Indians] (...) the lagoons were the residences of a sublime divinity and the soulful Indians saw in them areas full of charm and mystery.”

Additional notes on this part:

"There is the idea of the modern farmer who has monsters asleep in the lagoons and who can be awaken from its cries and who can respond to the deep emptiness of the rocks that surround them, as if it were the voice of an oracle. It isn’t anything more than the involuntary evocation of the divinity of the waters."

A concrete reference to the "black monster" of Lake Tota:

"[In 1880, the tradition - stated by Lilia Montaña de Silva in her aforementioned book, presumably regarding historical comments of Triana- ] (. ..) that a black monster lived in the enchanted waters of the lagoon still persisted among the residents surrounding Lake Tota, in the town of Cuitiva."

== Muisca ancestral conception ==
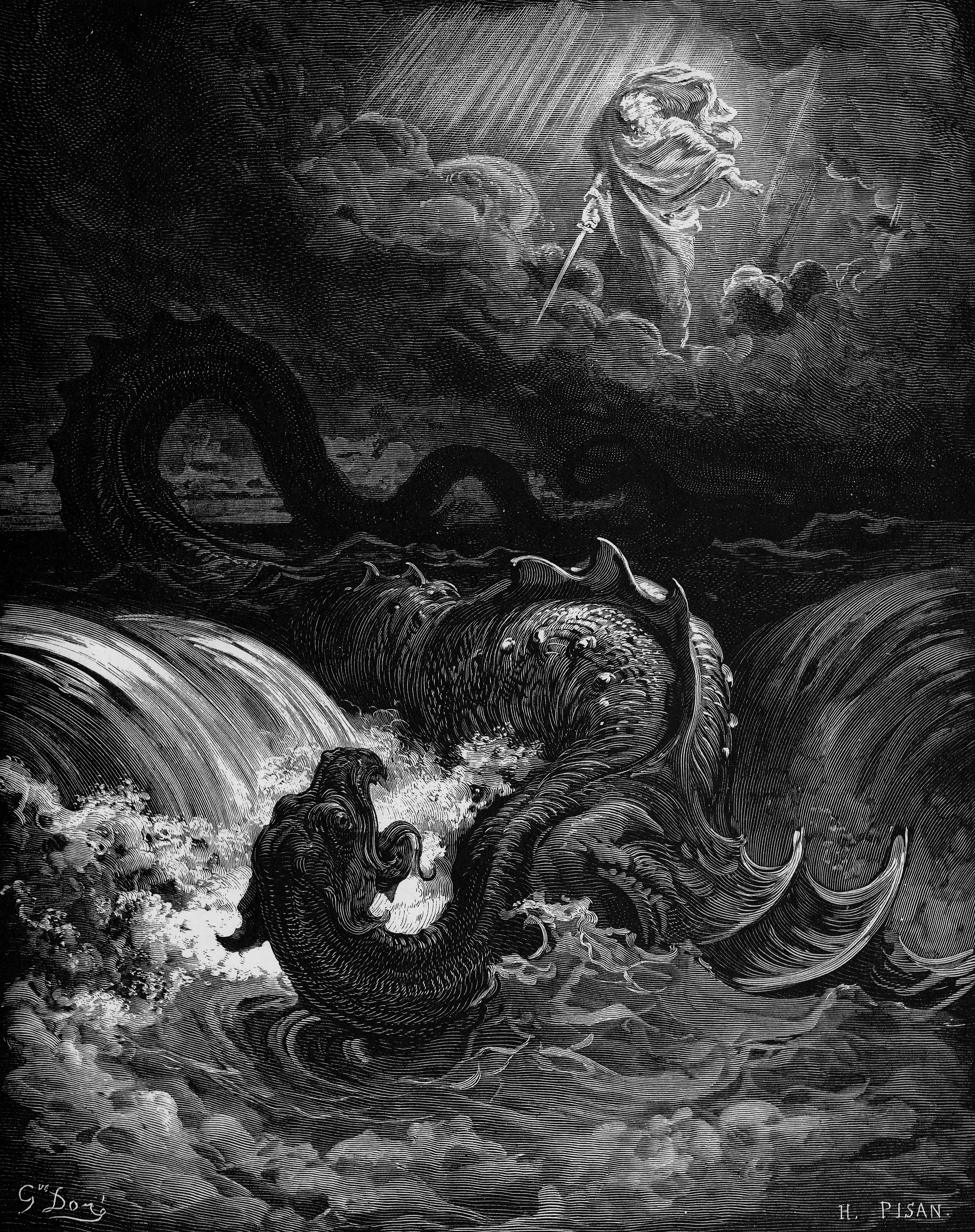
Destruction of Leviathan, depiction by Gustave Doré, 1865

When discussing the issue of the monster of Lake Tota in regards to Muisca ancestry, it must be placed in the context of their respective culture. This culture was independent, as advanced as the better known Inca and Maya civilizations and very different from the colonial thought that arrived with the Spanish colonization of the Americas in the 15th century.

=== The mythical origin of Lake Tota ===
Stories of the mythical origin of Lake Tota mention that “Monetá", the wise old indigenous priest, was preparing the "already extensive and powerful Muisca Confederation" to "exorcise the cruel and evil spirit, Busiraco" in the ancient cavity that now forms Lake Tota. Here's mention of the monstrous animal that lived there:

"And there, in that immense natural cavity of our history, dusty and sun-cracked earth, lived a big black snake, with eyes that shined. It advanced cautiously to the entrance of the great cave every night to await the giant fireball that now comes every night. Before entering the depths of the earth, Busiraco let out a loud laugh of triumph that echoed ironically in the remotest limits of Earth and filled the hearts of the Chibcha naives with terror. "

The ceremony spell against Busiraco aimed at resolving the suffering of summer and water shortages, led to the creation of Lake Tota; the monster is also mentioned as a snake, when he was fatally attacked:

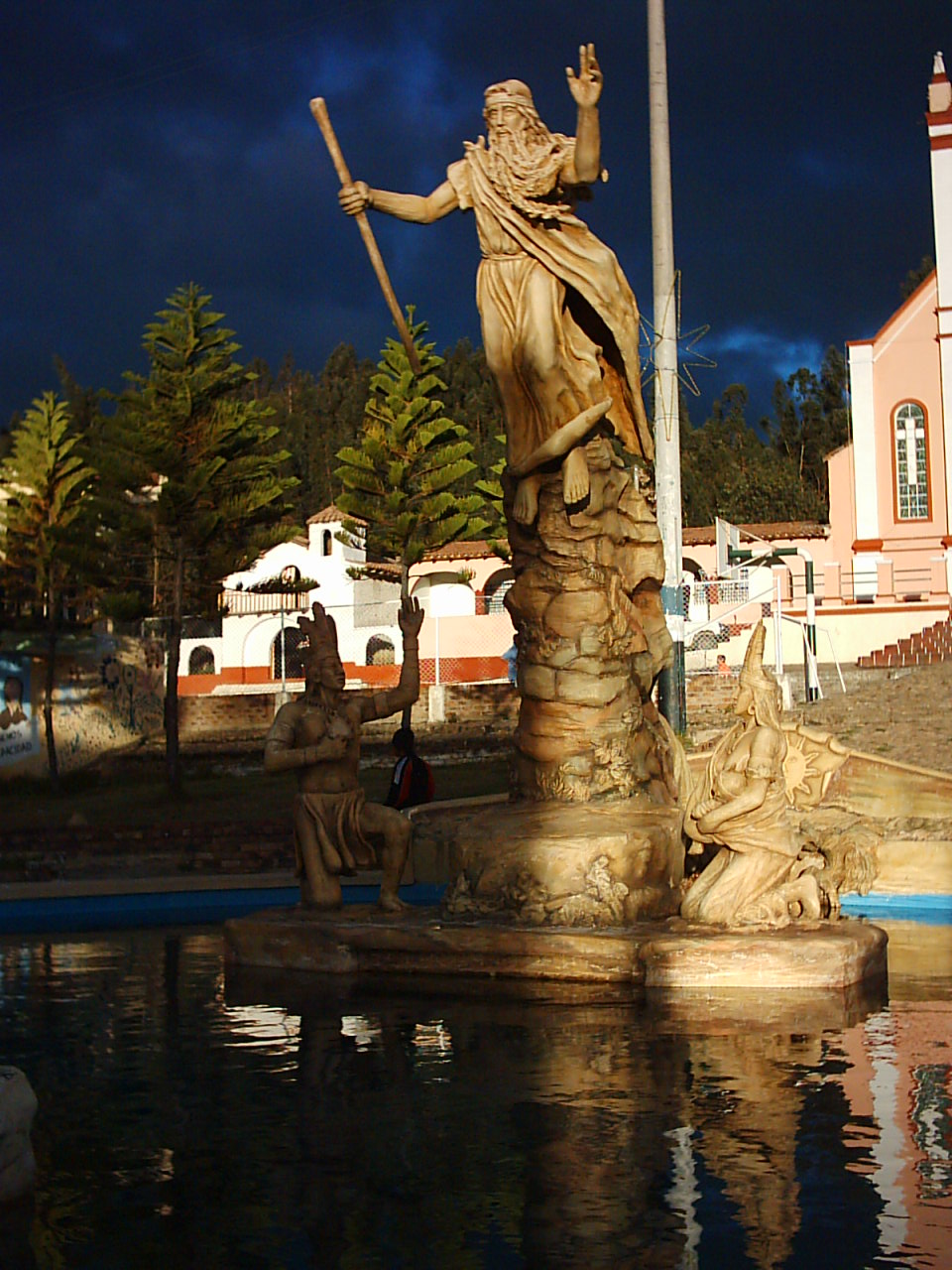
Monument of Bochica in the municipality Cuitiva (Boyacá)

"Siramena [who "Monetá" referred to as "the great dancer" ], danced with graceful and flexible movements turning faster and faster with each spin, and suddenly became still in front of the large painted rock, shrine of the goddess of water. She then lifted his head and took out a shiny gold disc from her clothes and offered it to the goddess; after making it gleam in the sun for a moment, she hurled it with great force against the snake. Its sharp edges were deeply embedded in the snake's body and then disappeared into the black scales of the reptile. The monster was mortally wounded. His repulsive movements became convulsive as he tried to attack one last time but his strength failed him. He lifted his tail and then dropped it loudly onto the dusty floor; then he stretched out to his full length and his body lay lifeless."

The "black snake" and the creation of the lake:

"Moneta removed from his breast a valuable gem. He thought for a moment. A tear rolled down his cheeks and took form as a diamond in the green case of an immense emerald [reserved for the Muisca "High Priest", originally delivered by the prophet "Bochica" when introducing indigenous priesthood]. He lifted the gem in his right hand and threw it hard into the abyss. The gem flashed through the air like brilliant embers of green. The crowd looked blank with amazement; the gemstone landed exactly on top of the lifeless black snake. And then...a miracle! The stone lost its natural hardness. The miracle manifested and the purest green waves started appearing and appearing. The vast gulf was filled with transparent waters fringed white foam. The people were amazed and could not comprehend what they saw."

== See also ==
- Nahuelito
- Brosno dragon
- Lake Tota
