= Guachetá =

- Municipality and town
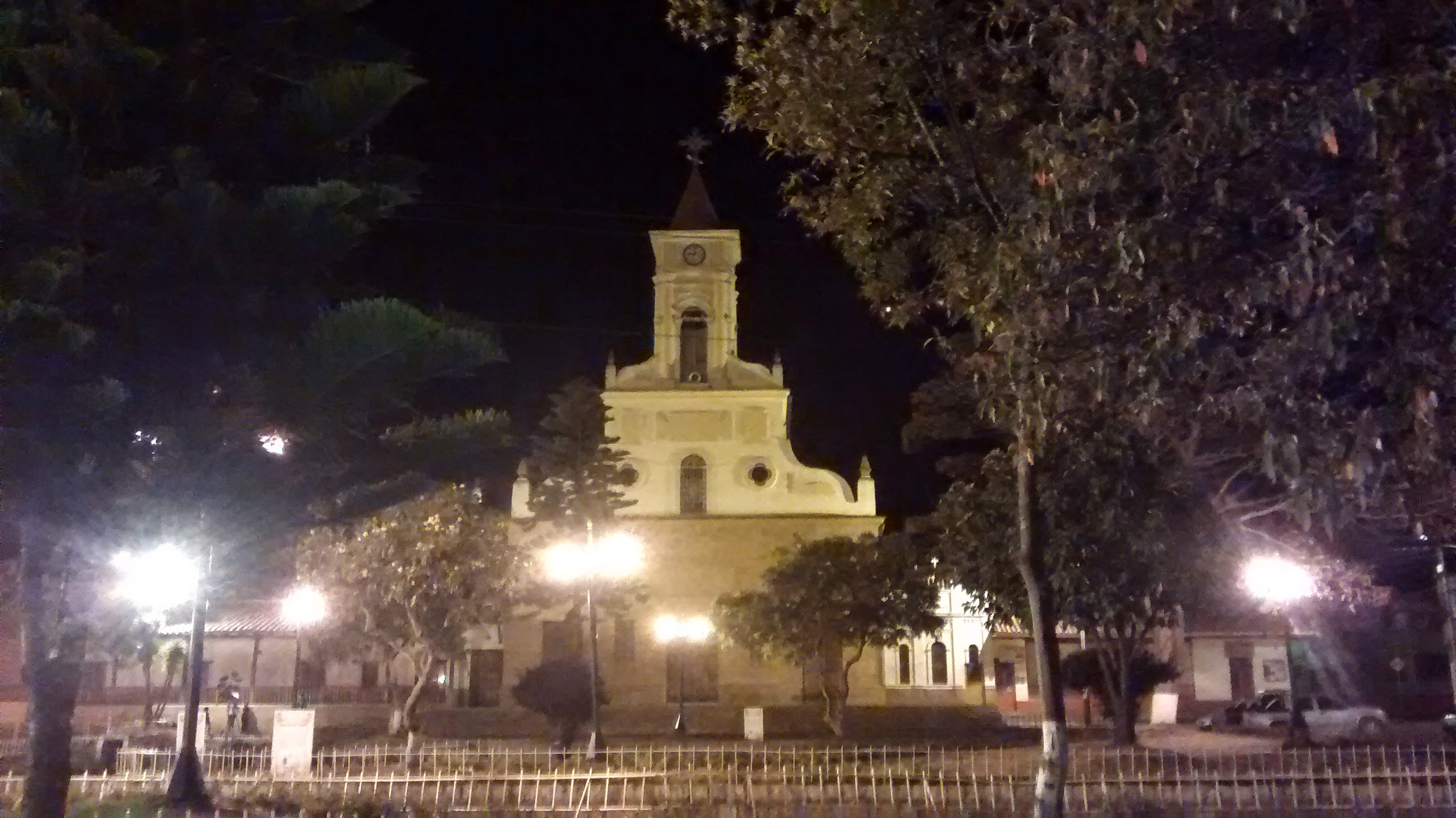
- Central square Guachetá

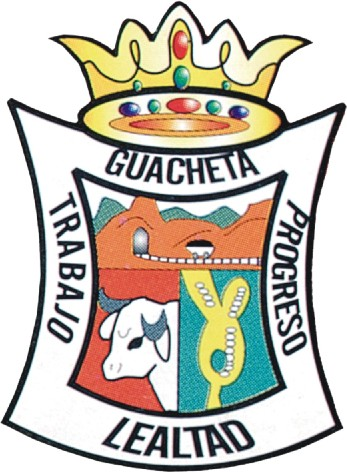
- Flag Coat of arms

- Location of the municipality and town inside Cundinamarca Department of Colombia

- Location in Colombia
- Coordinates: 5°23′8″N 73°41′8″W
- Country: Colombia
- Department: Cundinamarca
- Province: Ubaté Province
- Founded: 12 March 1537
- Founder: Gonzalo Jiménez de Quesada

Government
  - Mayor: Pablo Enrique Quicazán Ballesteros (2016-2019)

Area
  - Municipality and town: 177.45 km^{2} (68.51 sq mi)
- Elevation: 2,688 m (8,819 ft)

Population (2015)
  - Municipality and town: 11,385
  - Density: 64.159/km^{2} (166.17/sq mi)
  - Urban: 3,756
- Time zone: UTC-5 (Colombia Standard Time)
- Website: Official website

Guachetá is a municipality and town of Colombia in the Ubaté Province of the department of Cundinamarca. Guachetá is located at 118 kilometres (73 mi) from the capital Bogotá. It borders the Boyacá municipalities of Ráquira and Samacá in the north, Ubaté and Lenguazaque in the south, Ventaquemada and Lenguazaque in the east and in the west Fúquene and Ubaté. Guachetá is located on the Altiplano Cundiboyacense at altitudes between 2,600 metres (8,500 ft) and 3,500 metres (11,500 ft).

== History ==
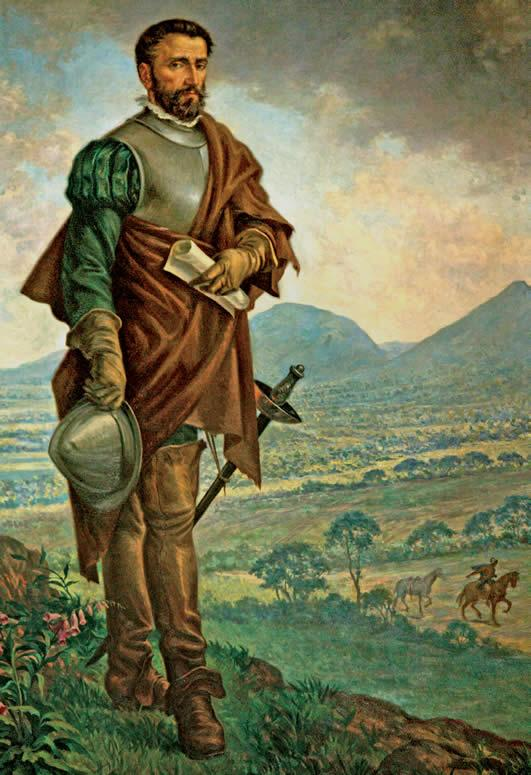
Gonzalo Jiménez de Quesada, founder of Guachetá

When the Spanish conquistadores entered the central highlands of Colombia, they encountered the Muisca Confederation; territories of the Muisca. Guachetá was an independent territory within the confederation, led by a cacique. The Spanish army leader Gonzalo Jiménez de Quesada founded Guachetá on March 12, 1537, and initially called it San Gregorio because of the date. The Muisca spoke Chibcha and Guachetá in Chibcha means "farmlands of the hill".

== Muisca myth ==
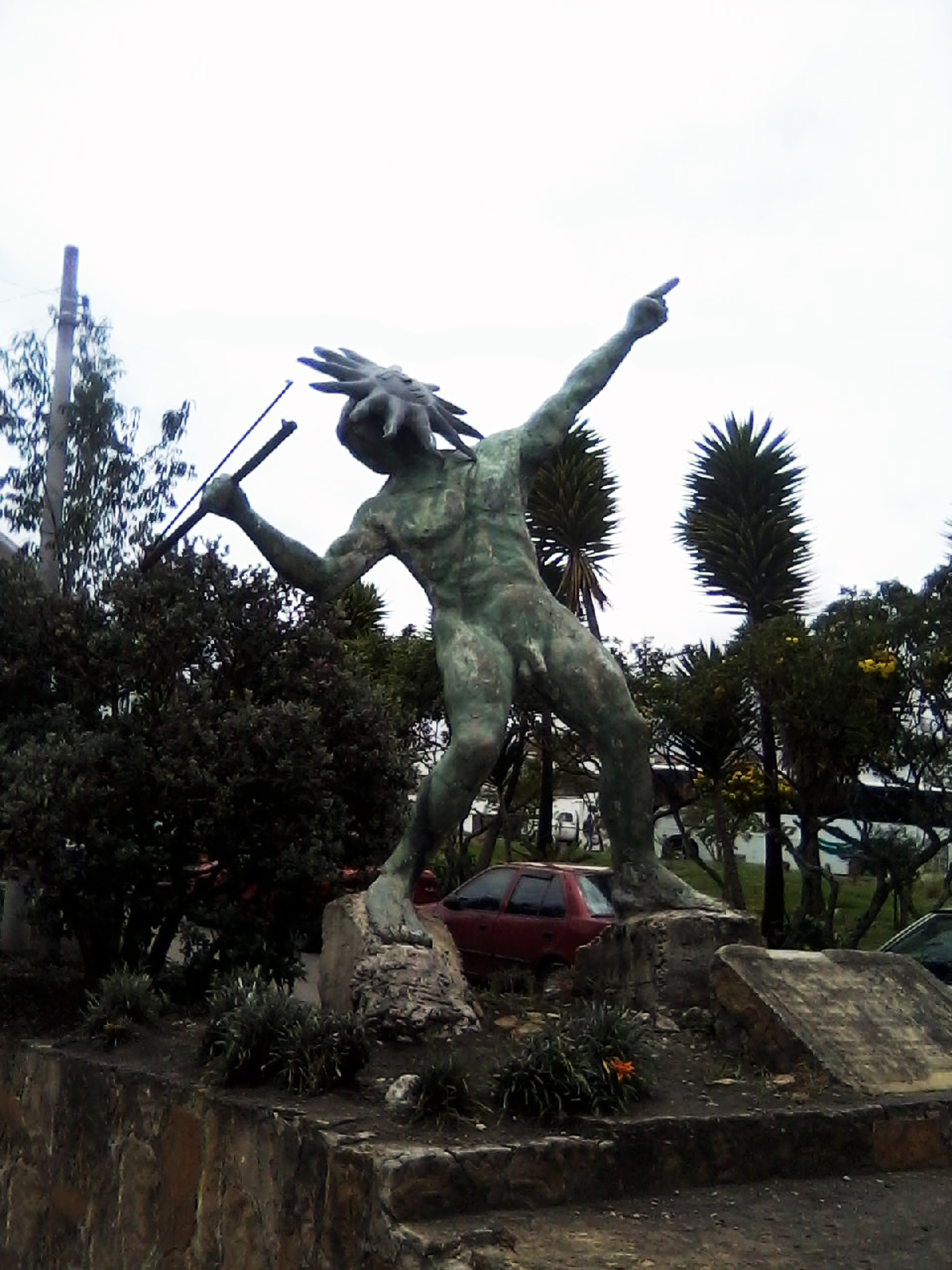
Statue honouring Goranchacha

One of the many stories of the mythology of the Muisca is the myth of the virgin maid of Guachetá. The daughter of the cacique allegedly became pregnant through the forces of the Sun, represented in the Muisca religion by Sué. After nine months pregnancy she bore an emerald that she put between her breasts. From this emerald grew the mythical cacique Goranchacha; son of the Sun.

== Economy ==
The main economical activities of Guachetá are agriculture, particularly potatoes, maize, peas and beans, along with coal mining and dairy production.
