= Idacansás =

Mythical chieftain of Muisca

Creature information
- Other name: Idacansas or Idacanzas
- Grouping: cacique
- Sub grouping: xeque
- Similar entities: Bochica
- Folklore: Muisca mythology

Origin
- Country: Muisca Confederation
- Region: Altiplano Cundiboyacense; Colombia
- Details: Sun Temple, Sugamuxi

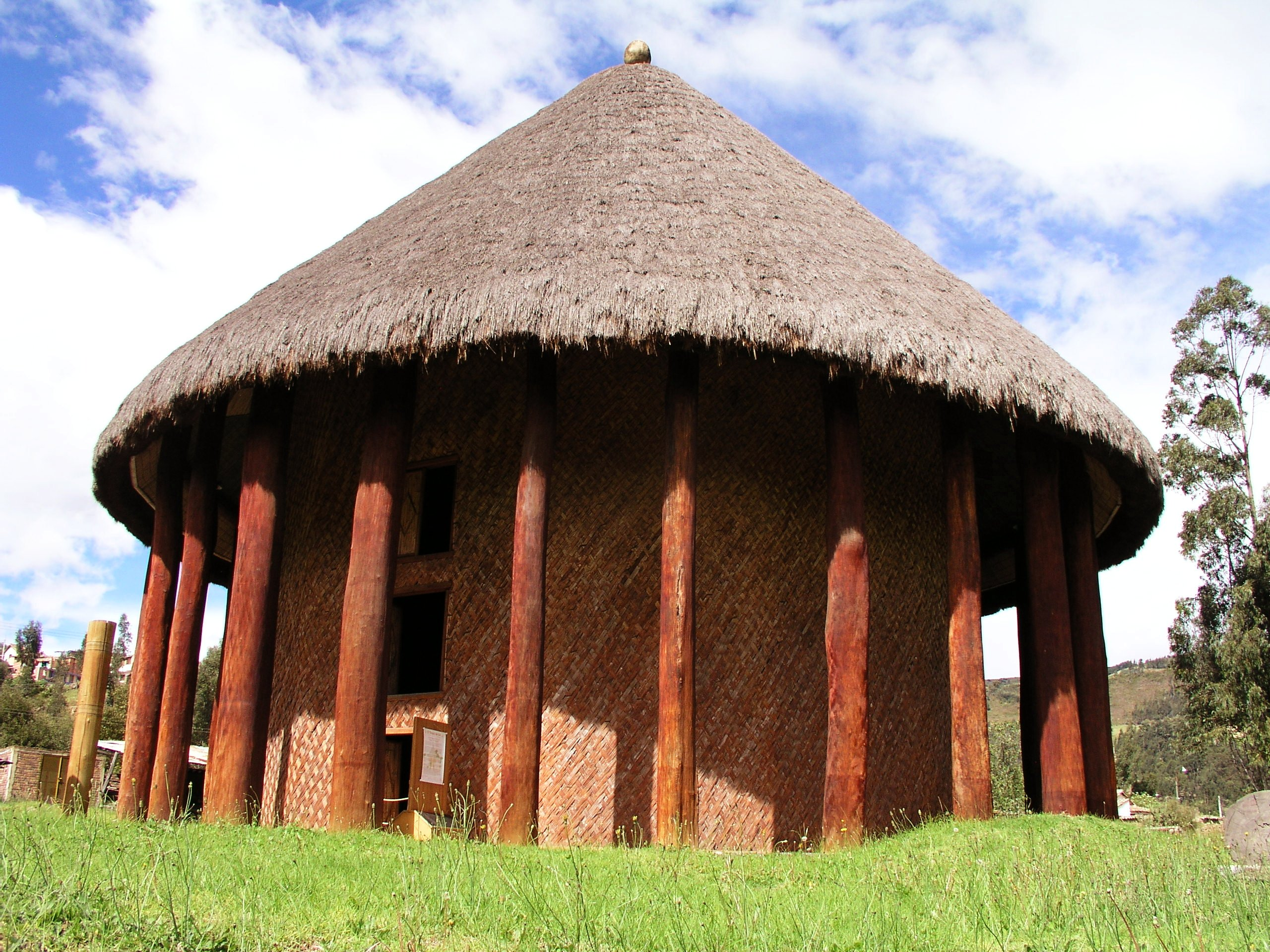
Sun Temple reconstruction Archeology museum Sogamoso

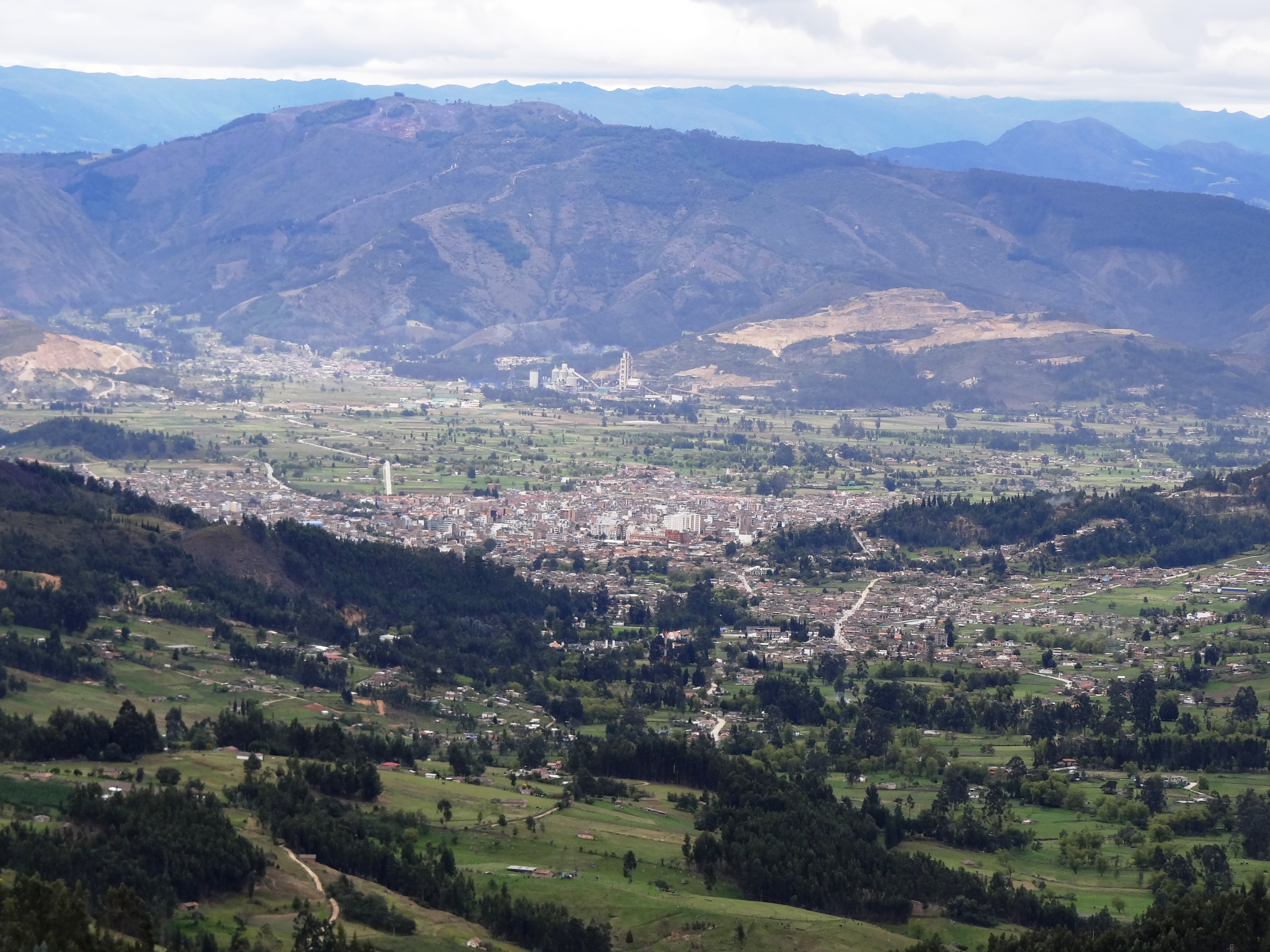
View on the Iraka Valley, Sogamoso

Coat of arms of Sogamoso, city of the Sun

Idacansás, Idacansas, Idacanzas or Iduakanzas was a mythical cacique who was said to have been the first priest of the sacred city of Sugamuxi, present-day Sogamoso, Colombia, then part of the territories of the Muisca. He is characterized by his great magical powers as he could make rain and hail and transmit diseases and warmth.

== Background ==
In the centuries before the arrival of the Spanish conquistadors, the central highlands of Colombia consisted of the Muisca Confederation, ruled by zaques from Hunza and zipas from Bacatá. Other areas, such as the territories surrounding Sogamoso were ruled by caciques; respected religious nobility. Before the time of the first confirmed human rulers Hunzahúa, who is considered an heir of Idacansás, and Meicuchuca, inaugurated in 1450, the chronicles are based on Folklore.

== Mythography ==
Cacique Idacansás was together with Bochica the priest of the Sun, with his Sun Temple located in Sugamuxi. Allegedly the only cacicazgo (reign of a cacique) where a system of democracy existed was the cacicazgo of Sugamuxi in the Iraka Valley. 17th century Spanish chronicler Lucas Fernández de Piedrahita wrote that the cacique of Sugamuxi was chosen by the natives of Firavitoba and Tobasía, an election organized by the caciques of Gámeza, Busbanzá, Pesca and Toca. In case of conflicts, the cacique of Tundama (present-day Duitama) would intervene.

The cacique of Sugamuxi always had a double role as political and religious leader, as High Priest of the Sun. Under his rule was the Sun Temple where Muisca pilgrims from far away gathered. The reign of Idacansás made Sugamuxi a religious centre; the Rome or Mecca of the Muisca. The myth of Idacansás explains the origin of the cacicazgo and the sacred character around the Sun as unique on the Altiplano Cundiboyacense that was ruled by often brutal (Nemequene) dictatorial rulers.

To maintain the support of the people, Idacansás used lies and deceit; he pretended he was angry with the people and threatened them with death, diseases or other methods. In other occasions he would climb a mountain dressed in coloured mantles and accompanied by some of his nobles and to let the people know there was an epidemic of dysentery coming, he would sprinkle orange or ochre-red dust in the air. Sometimes he would dress in white and throw ash in the air announcing that ice and aridity would come over the fertile lands of the Muisca, destroying their crops. To enhance the character of his foretellings he would react irritated to the people who came to see him as priest.

The rule of Idacansás was so widely respected and feared because he was able to change the chronological order of things happening.

Some Muisca chroniclers equate Idacansás with Bochica.

== See also ==
- Iraca
- Muisca
- Muisca mythology, Thomagata
