= Iraca =

Ruler and high priest of Sugamuxi

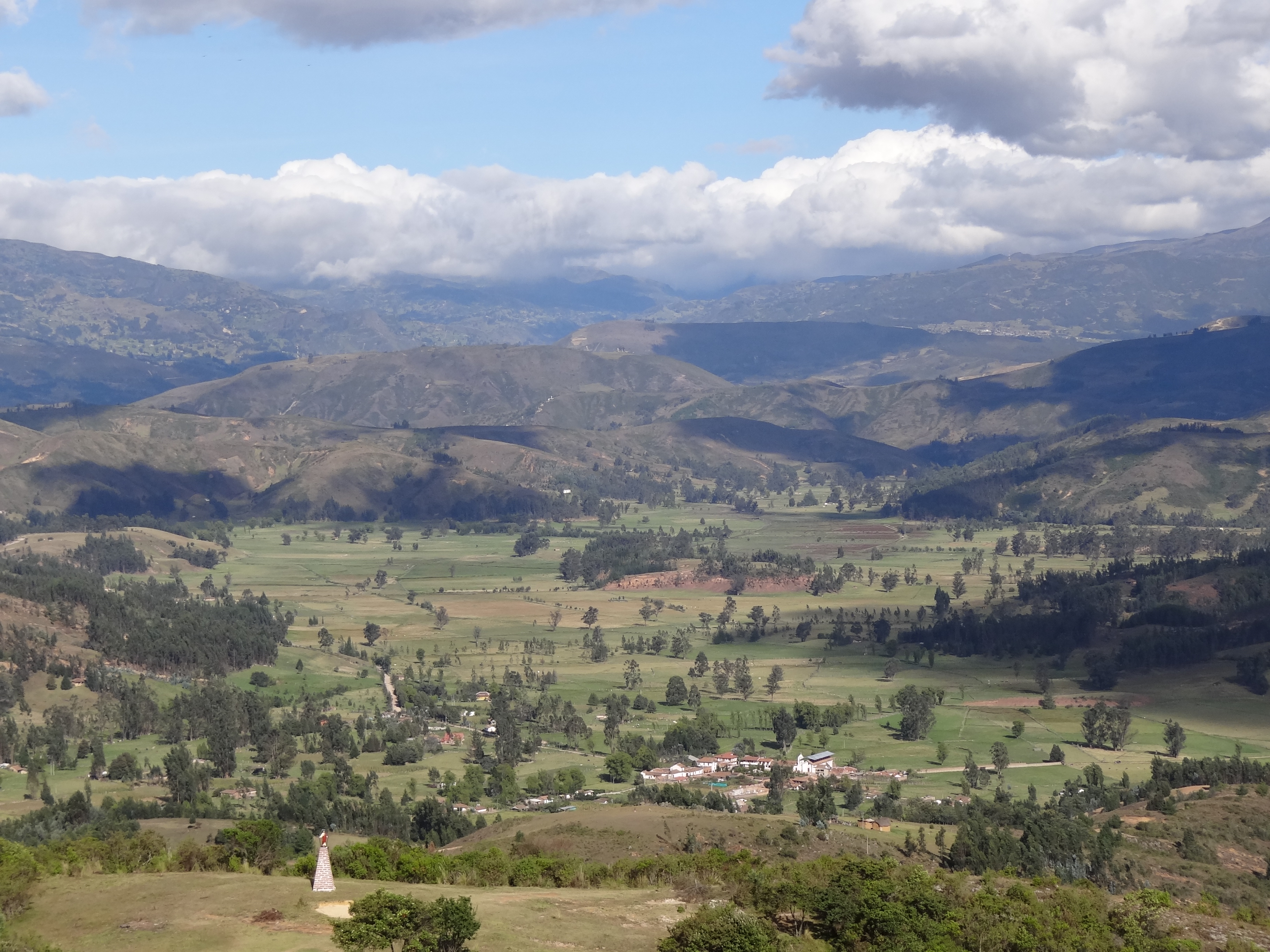
View of the sacred Iraca Valley (Tobasía)

The iraca, sometimes spelled iraka, was the ruler and high priest of Sugamuxi in the confederation of the Muisca who inhabited the Altiplano Cundiboyacense; the central highlands of the Colombian Andes. Iraca can also refer to the Iraka Valley over which they ruled. Important scholars who wrote about the iraca were Lucas Fernández de Piedrahita, Alexander von Humboldt and Ezequiel Uricoechea.

== Background ==
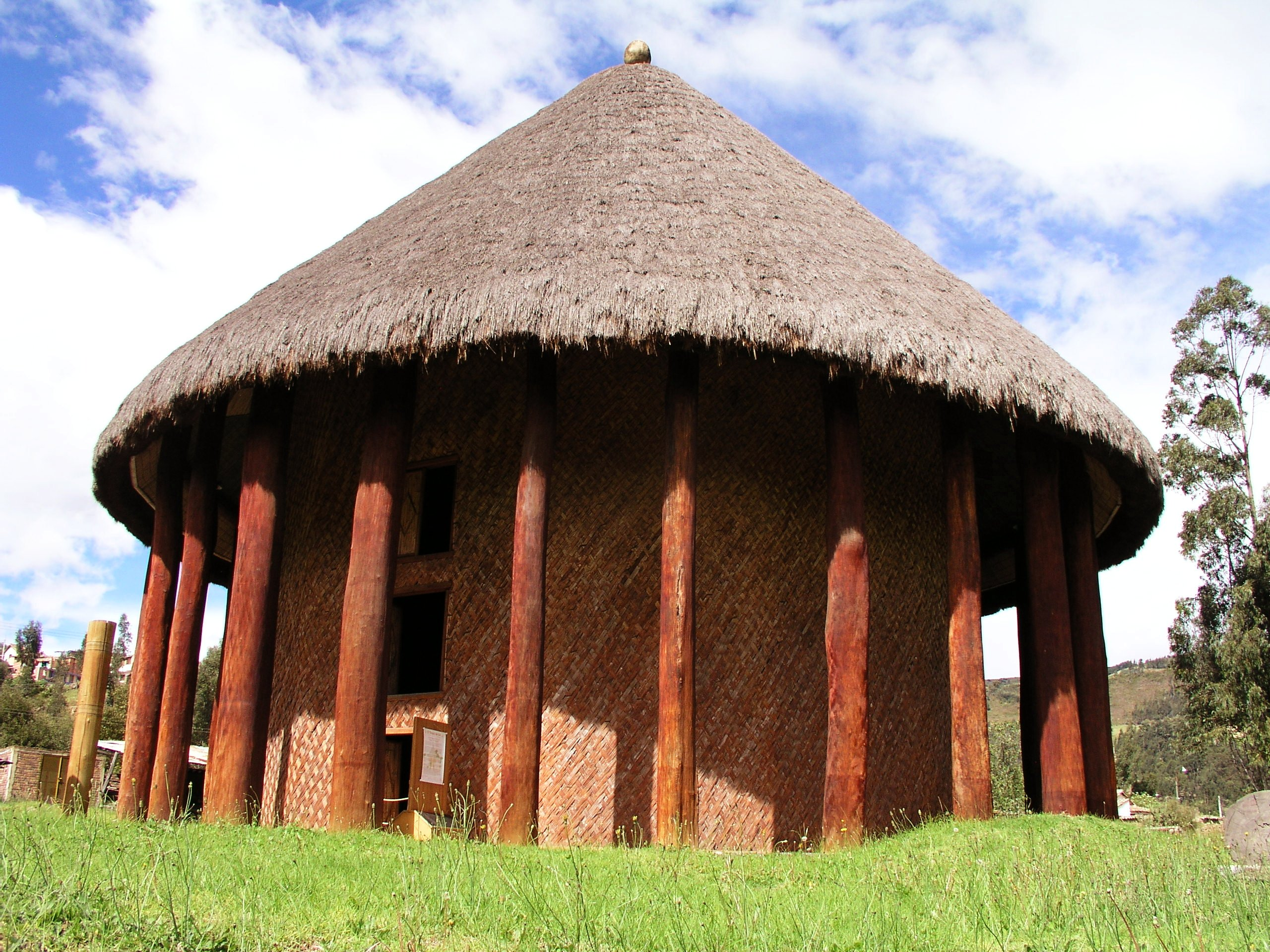
Reconstruction of the Sun Temple of Sugamuxi, where the iraca lived

In the centuries before the Spanish conquistadores entered central Colombia in the 1530s, the valleys of the Eastern Ranges were ruled by four main leaders and several independent caciques. The northern territories were ruled by the zaque from Hunza, the present-day capital of Boyacá department and the southern area under the reign of the zipa, based in Bacatá, currently known as the Colombian capital Bogotá. Other important rulers were the iraca and the cacique Tundama based in Tundama, today known as the city of Duitama.

== Description ==
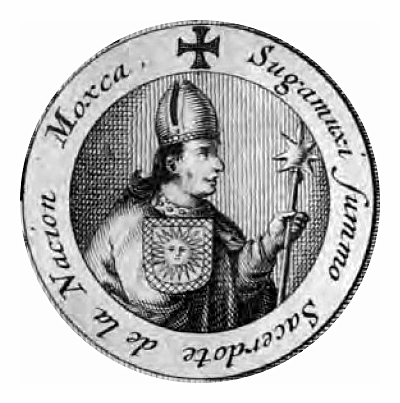
Sugamuxi, the last iraca

The iraca was a cacique of the sacred City of the Sun Sugamuxi, present-day Sogamoso. His domain was a territory spreading over Sogamoso, Pesca, Iza, Tobasía, Firavitoba, Busbanzá, Toca, Gámeza, Tota, Mongua and areas adjacent to Lake Tota.

The iraca was both a political and a religious leader (priest), in the religion of the Muisca said to have descended from Idacansás and educated by messenger god Bochica. It is thought that the iracas inherited the knowledge of Bochica from their predecessors. The role of iraca was widely respected in the Muisca territories and also was important for the astronomy of the Muisca. The iraca was elected by the caciques of Gámeza, Busbanzá, Pesca and Toca. Generally a cacique from Tobasía or Firavitoba was elected alternatingly. In cases where the election was indecisive, the tundama of Tundama would intervene.

The iraca of Sugamuxi lived in the Sun Temple, the most important temple of the Muisca, built to worship the Muisca Sun god Sué, in Sugamuxi, decorated inside with golden figures; tunjos and golden plates outside.

The Sun Temple was destroyed by fire from the torches of soldiers in the army of Gonzalo Jiménez de Quesada, the conquistador who made first contact with the Muisca in September 1537 in search of El Dorado.

== Known iraca ==
From the ages before the Spanish conquest of the Muisca little is known and much is based on mythology. Confirmed iraca were:

- Nompanim - died early 16th century
- Sugamuxi - died 1539

== See also ==
- Spanish conquest of the Muisca
- Muisca
- Muisca Confederation
- Muisca rulers, Tundama
- Idacansás
