= Muisca mythology =

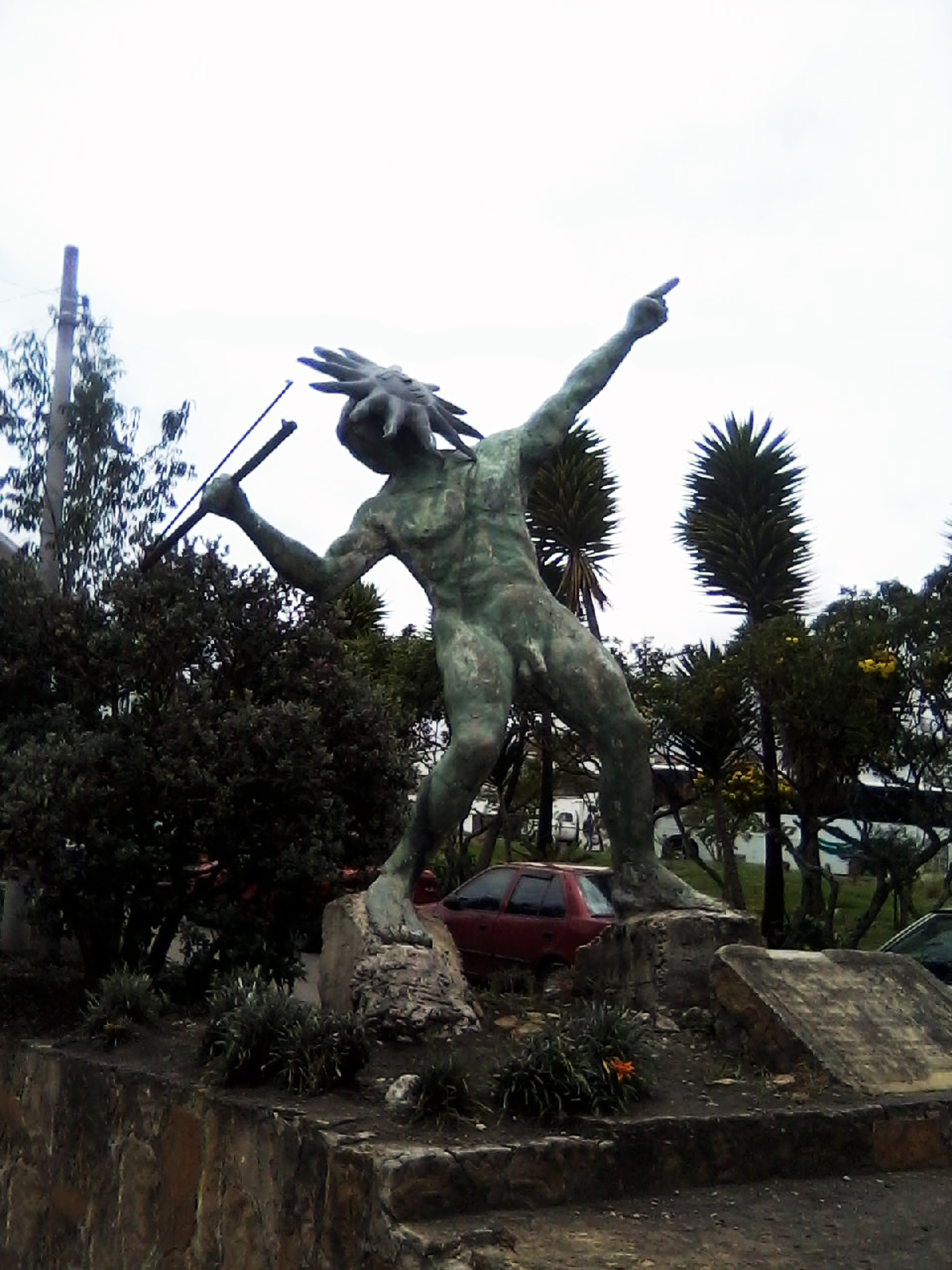
Goranchacha, one of the mythical heroes in the mythology of the Muisca

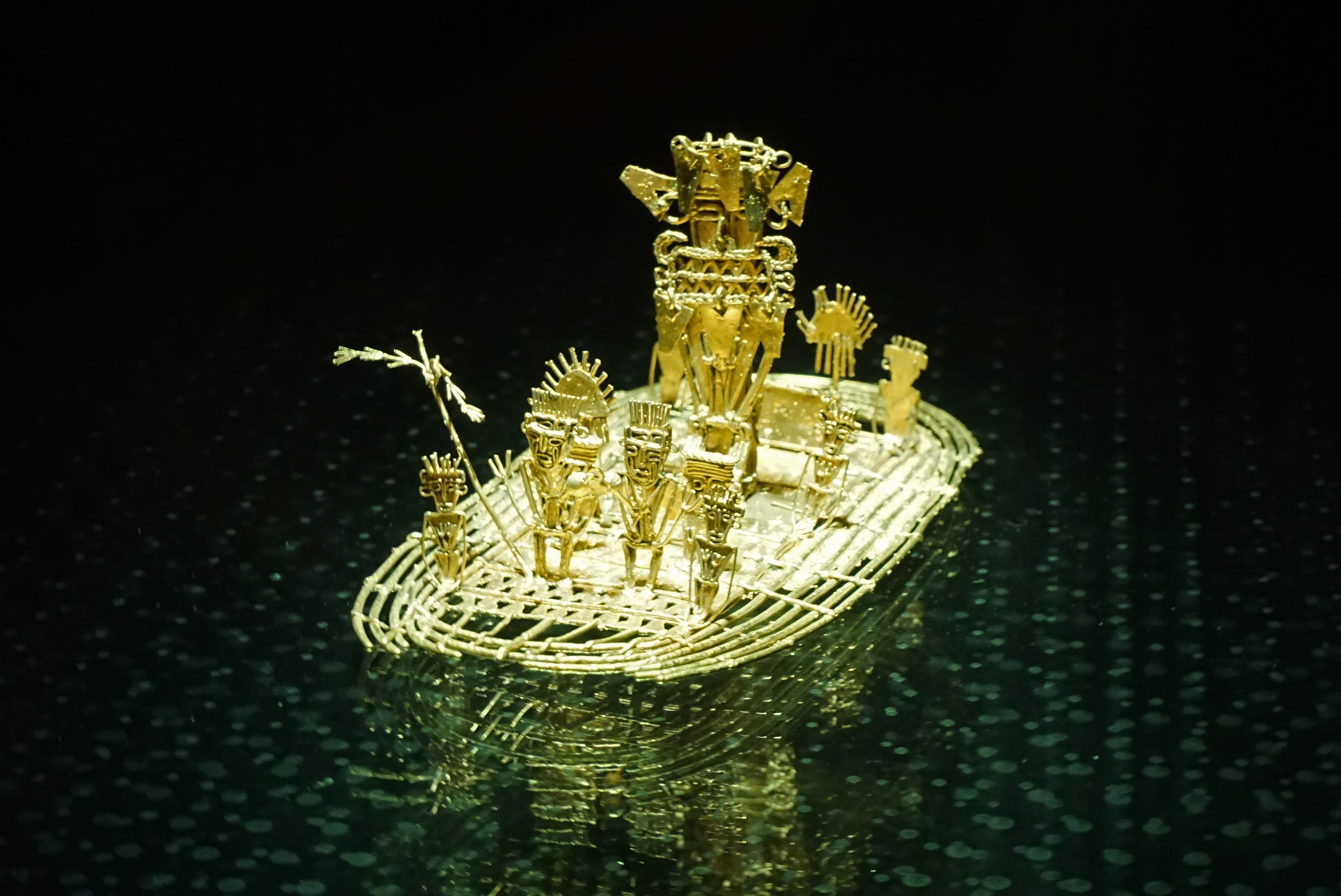
The Muisca raft, discovered in 1969 and associated with an offering by Pasca chiefs

Knowledge of Muisca mythology has come from Muisca scholars Javier Ocampo López, Pedro Simón, Lucas Fernández de Piedrahita, Juan de Castellanos and conquistador Gonzalo Jiménez de Quesada who was the European making first contact with the Muisca in the 1530s.

== Muisca mythology ==
The times before the Spanish conquest of the Muisca Confederation are filled with mythology. The first confirmed human rulers of the two capitals Hunza and Bacatá are said to have descended from mythical creatures. Apart from that, other Muisca myths exist, such as the legendary El Dorado and the Monster of Lake Tota. The tradition includes a selection of received myths concerning the origin and organisation of the universe. Their belief system may be described as a polytheistic religion containing a very strong element of spirituality based on an epistemology of mysticism.

=== Creation of the universe ===
Bachué ("the Grandmother") is a non-material principle of creation, the will, the thought and the imagination of all the things to come. She is a similar concept to the principle of tao in the Chinese mythology.

The time of unquyquie nxie ("the first thought") is the time of the cosmic origin, when the thoughts of Bague became actions. This is the time when Bague created the builders of the universe and ordered them to create.

=== Beginning of the world ===
The world started with Chiminigagua, from whose belly bloomed light, of which were created the stars, land and stone.

=== Origin of mankind ===
According to Muisca legends, mankind originated in Lake Iguaque, when grandmother goddess Bachué came out, against the divine laws, Chibchacum brought forth a flood that covered the world and nearly destroyed the human race. Then, the protective god Bochica drove away the waters through the Tequendama Falls, and taught humans the basis of civilisation, agriculture, religion, the arts, and crafts. When he was about to leave for his heavenly kingdom, Cuchavira (the rainbow) appeared and Bochica announced his second coming, far away in the future, in an event marked by death and disease. These events are similar to the biblical histories of Genesis and Apocalypse.

=== Deities ===
The first gods, constructors of the universe, built the first quyca or ceremonial temple. They were:

- Bachué ("The one with the naked breasts"): the mother goddess who rose from the underworld to give birth to the human race
- Bochica ("The father of civilisation") also called Nemqueteba, Nemquereteba, Sadigua, Chimizapagua
- Chía: the Moon goddess of the Muisca.
- Suá: The sun god of the Muisca.
- Chibchacum ("The one who holds the earth"): The universal legislator.
- Chiminigagua: creator of all, from them emerged the light, from which Sua and Chía were sacredly formed.
- Cuchavira: god of the rainbow.
- Cuza ("The one who is like the night"): the male principle of creation.
- Huitaca: rebelling goddess of sexual liberation
- Nencatacoa ("The protector of festivities, fapqwa, and the arts") God of fapqwa (Muisca beverage), celebrations and artistic expression. Necantacoa had the shape of a bear-fox.
- Suetyba: A Deity that the Spanish inquisitors associated with the devil, probably a deity related to magic and the night.

The gods danced a very long dance (sas quyhynuca), with the music of the fo drum, in the first ceremony. This ceremony gave origin to space and time.

Then, the gods created the first materials of the universe: fiva (the air), faova (the cosmic cloud) and ie (the smoke). Then, they created the six directions of the material dimension, and in the middle of itugue, the emptiness, they created the centre of power tomsa (bellybutton of the universe). But, still the universe had no consistency, and they waited many bxogonoas aeons until the sas bequia, the beginning of the world.

=== Mythological creatures ===
Several mythological creatures have been described by the chroniclers:

- Thomagata, said to have been one of the most religious of the zaques, after Idacansás
- Idacansás, allegedly a mythical priest from Sugamuxi who was able to change the order of things
- Goranchacha, a mythical cacique who moved the capital of the northern Muisca from Ramiriquí to the later capital Hunza
- Pacanchique, according to Muisca myths recovered his fiancé Azay from ruler Quemuenchatocha by first turning her into a dead person and then bringing her back to life using different plants. He also showed the Spanish conquistadores the way to Nemequene's palace Other Muisca people where human and mythological character converge are:
- Hunzahúa, first zaque of Hunza, allegedly committing incest with his sister and said to have fled
- Meicuchuca, first zipa of Bacatá, one of his wives mythologically turned into a snake

=== Other Muisca myths ===
- El Dorado, the man or city made of gold, that was not so mythical but a main motive for the Spanish to conquer Colombia. The ritual is represented in the Muisca raft, a piece of gold working found in Pasca almost 400 years after the arrival of the Spanish
- Monster of Lake Tota, allegedly a monstrous snake or fish living in Lake Tota
- Hunzahúa Well, a well that according to the mythology of the Muisca originated from spilled chicha when the mother of Hunzahúa caught him and his older sister, Noncetá, while they were copulating.
- Fura and Tena, the first woman and man created by the god Are to populate the earth. Because Fura was not faithful, they lost their immortality, so they aged and died. Are took pity on them and turned them into rocky crags protected from storms, and Fura's tears became into emeralds.

== See also ==
- Muisca women
- Aztec mythology
- Inca
- Maya mythology
- Muisca religion
- El Dorado, a legend that grew out of a Muisca ritual
- Lake Iguaque, a lake involved in creation, in the mythology of the Muisca
- Lake Guatavita, a sacred ceremonial lake of the Muisca
