= Bochica =

Mythological figure of the Muisca (Chibcha) culture

- Education, messenger god
- Member of Muisca religion
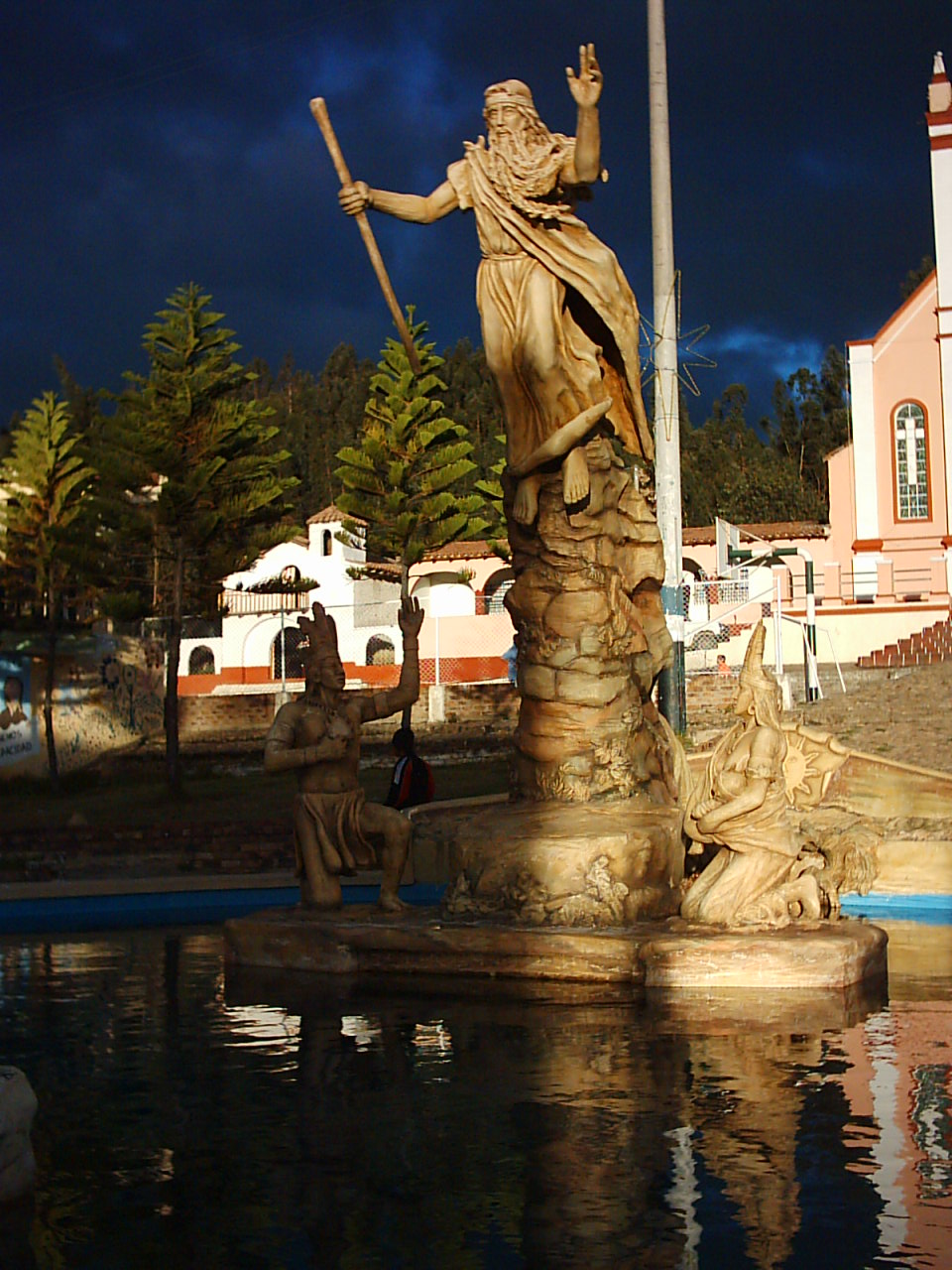
- Monument to Bochica in Cuítiva
- Other names: Nemquetaha, Nemqueteba, Sadigua
- Affiliation: Chiminigagua
- Region: Altiplano Cundiboyacense
- Ethnic group: Muisca

Equivalents
- Etruscan: Turms
- Greek: Hermes
- Hindu: Narada
- Roman: Mercury
- Egyptian: Thoth
- Celtic: Lugus

Bochica (also alluded to as Nemquetaha, Nemqueteba and Sadigua) is a mythical figure in the religion of the Muisca, who inhabited the Altiplano Cundiboyacense before the Spanish invasion by conquistadors in the central Andean highlands of present-day Colombia. There is little documentation concerning Bochica, who was mentioned by name in records from 1563 from Ubaque. "Bochica was variously described by witnesses as a building which [Melchor] Pérez de Arteaga had destroyed - as the father of a 'tiger' - perhaps a puma or jaguar that had recently been attacking travellers of local roads, and as an 'idol'. When asked who Bochica was, Ubaque replied that 'he is a wind' - (un viento) - and that he was in the site of the building that the Spanish had destroyed." In the 1688 work, Historia general de las conquistas del Nuevo Reyno de Granada, by Spanish bishop Lucas Fernández de Piedrahita, Bochica had "become a civilising hero, descending to earth to found the Muisca religion".

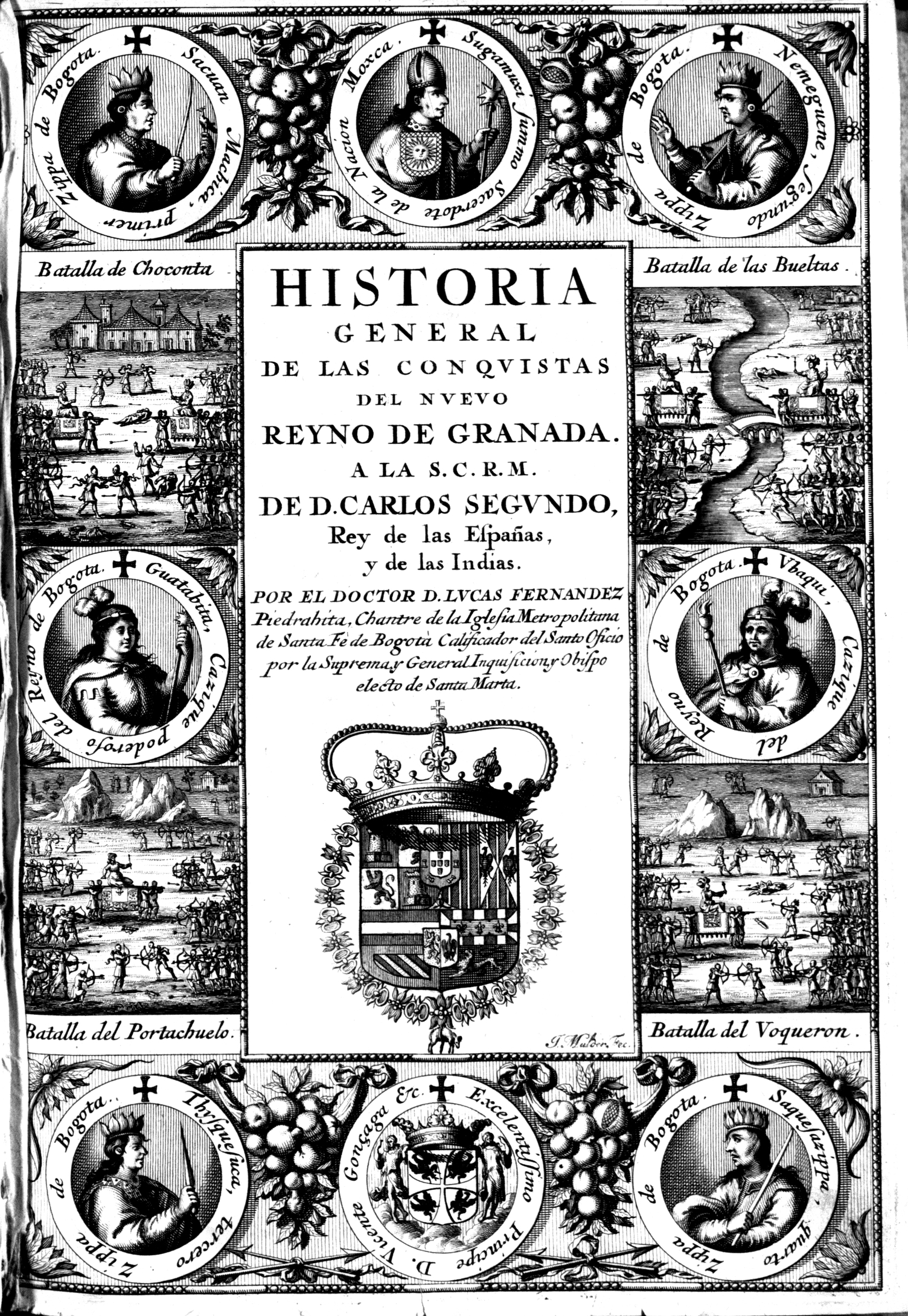
Lucas Fernández de Piedrahita, Historia general de las conquistas del Nuevo Reyno de Granada, 1688

Bochica appeared in Pasca in Cundinamarca and later in Gámeza, Boyacá where the people showed him hospitability. He retreated in the Toya cave where many caciques visited him for wisdom. Caciques from Tópaga, Tota, Pesca, Firavitoba and others consulted Bochica. After the supreme being of the Muisca, Chiminigagua sent them to Sugamuxi the city became a sacred place where the Temple of the Sun would be erected and religious festivities organised around the arrival of Bochica.

== See also ==
- Idacansás
