= Muisca Confederations (political units) =

Former Andean highlands confederations

Muisca complex society
- c. 800–1540
- Map of the Muisca territory according to Falchetti and Plazas in the 1970s. This map has received criticism, however, as it mainly uses the late 17th century chronicler Lucas Fernández de Piedrahita, considered unreliable. According to colonial documents, the confederations of Sogamoso and Duitama were independent of Tunja and had great importance.
- Capital: Bacatá (Bogotá), Hunza, and Suamox, Tundama (800–1540)
- Common languages: Muysccubun dialects
- Religion: Muisca religion
- Government: Independent confederations of chiefdoms
- Various titles
  - ~1450–1470 (colonial chronicler Piedrahíta): zaque Hunzahúa zipa Meicuchuca
  - 1470–1490 (colonial chronicler Piedrahíta): zaque Saguamanchica zipa Michuá
  - 1490–1537 (colonial chronicler Piedrahíta) 1490–1514 (colonial chronicler Piedrahíta): zaque Quemuenchatocha zipa Nemequene
  - 1514–1537 (colonial chronicler Piedrahíta): zipa Tisquesusa
  - 1537–1540 (colonial chronicler Piedrahíta) 1537–1539 (colonial chronicler Piedrahíta): zaque Aquiminzaque zipa Sagipa
- Historical era: Pre-Columbian
  - Established: c. 800
  - Spanish conquest begins: March 1537
  - Conquest of Funza (Bacatá): 20 April 1537
  - Conquest of Hunza: 20 August 1537
  - Destruction of the Sun Temple: September 1537
  - Foundation of Bogotá Battle of Tocarema: 6 August 1538; 20 August 1538
  - Foundation of Tunja Death of Tundama: 6 August 1539; December 1539
  - Execution of Aquiminzaque: 1540

Area
  - Total: 22.000 km^{2} (8.494 sq mi)

Population
  - Early 16th century: 2 million
Preceded by	Succeeded by
Herrera Period	New Kingdom of Granada
- Today part of: Colombia: Cundinamarca; Boyacá; Santander

Muisca Confederations were loose confederations of different Muisca chiefdoms in the Eastern Andean highlands of what is today Colombia before the Spanish conquest of northern South America. These unions, centred around main chiefdoms recognised by smaller ones, were not a single, even loose, muisca confederation of chiefdoms, but multiple, independent regional entities. The area, presently called Altiplano Cundiboyacense, comprised the current departments of Boyacá, Cundinamarca and minor parts of Santander.

Usually, Muisca chiefdoms were composed of various basic matrilineal units (uta, minor, or sibyn, major) called capitanías by the Spaniards. However, power was based on individual alliances of Muisca rulers with households or basic units. Often, sibyn were villages and uta groups of houses. Four confederations of chiefdoms formed in Muisca territory: Bogotá, Tunja, Duitama and Sogamoso. Additionally, the Chibcha-speaking Guane and Lache were also ruled by the confederation of Guanentá and the confederation of El Cocuy respectively. Different models exist to explain the nature of power among Muisca elites.

== Geography ==
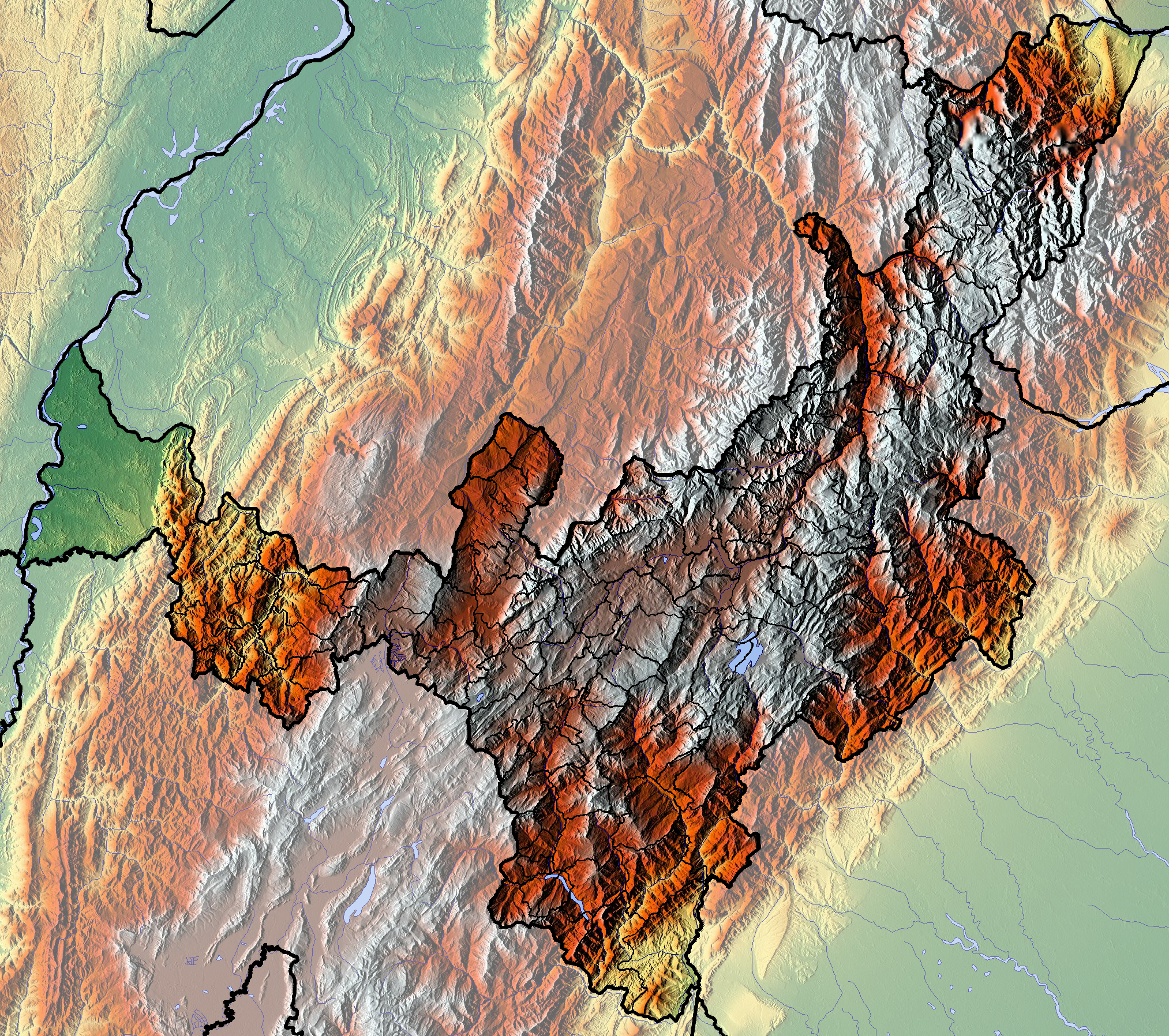
Topography Boyacá

=== Climate ===
Climate charts for the extremes and four most important settlements of the Muisca Confederation
NW: Vélez – 2050 m Climate chart (precipitation, max. and min. temperature): J / F / M / A / M / J / J / A / S / O / N / D; 34 19 7 / 46 19 8 / 67 19 9 / 113 19 9 / 102 18 9 / 63 18 9 / 47 18 9 / 47 18 9 / 56 18 8 / 119 18 9 / 112 18 9 / 60 19 8; █ Average max. and min. temperatures in °C; █ Precipitation totals in mm; Source: Climate-data.org – Bogotá; Imperial conversion; J / F / M / A / M / J / J / A / S / O / N / D; 1.3 67 45 / 1.8 67 46 / 2.6 67 47 / 4.4 66 49 / 4 65 49 / 2.5 64 48 / 1.9 64 48 / 1.9 64 47 / 2.2 65 47 / 4.7 65 47 / 4.4 65 47 / 2.4 66 46; █ Average max. and min. temperatures in °F; █ Precipitation totals in inches	Lowest: Charalá – 1290 m Climate chart (precipitation, max. and min. temperature): J / F / M / A / M / J / J / A / S / O / N / D; 71 29 15 / 97 29 16 / 157 29 16 / 272 28 16 / 283 28 16 / 176 27 16 / 175 29 15 / 192 28 15 / 224 28 15 / 312 27 16 / 244 27 16 / 103 28 16; █ Average max. and min. temperatures in °C; █ Precipitation totals in mm; Source: Climate-data.org – Charalá; Imperial conversion; J / F / M / A / M / J / J / A / S / O / N / D; 2.8 83 59 / 3.8 83 60 / 6.2 84 60 / 11 82 61 / 11 82 61 / 6.9 81 61 / 6.9 84 60 / 7.6 83 59 / 8.8 82 60 / 12 81 61 / 9.6 81 61 / 4.1 82 60; █ Average max. and min. temperatures in °F; █ Precipitation totals in inches	Highest: Aquitania – 3030 m Climate chart (precipitation, max. and min. temperature): J / F / M / A / M / J / J / A / S / O / N / D; 11 17 6 / 22 17 6 / 49 17 7 / 139 16 8 / 219 15 8 / 113 14 7 / 109 14 7 / 94 14 7 / 83 15 7 / 109 15 7 / 75 16 7 / 24 16 7; █ Average max. and min. temperatures in °C; █ Precipitation totals in mm; Source: Climate-data.org – Aquitania; Imperial conversion; J / F / M / A / M / J / J / A / S / O / N / D; 0.4 62 43 / 0.9 62 44 / 1.9 63 45 / 5.5 61 46 / 8.6 59 46 / 4.4 57 45 / 4.3 56 45 / 3.7 57 45 / 3.3 58 44 / 4.3 60 45 / 3 61 45 / 0.9 61 44; █ Average max. and min. temperatures in °F; █ Precipitation totals in inches	NE: Soatá – 1950 m Climate chart (precipitation, max. and min. temperature): J / F / M / A / M / J / J / A / S / O / N / D; 41 25 12 / 58 25 12 / 88 25 13 / 271 24 13 / 241 23 13 / 126 23 13 / 101 23 12 / 103 23 13 / 155 24 13 / 260 23 13 / 163 23 13 / 84 24 12; █ Average max. and min. temperatures in °C; █ Precipitation totals in mm; Source: Climate-data.org – Soatá; Imperial conversion; J / F / M / A / M / J / J / A / S / O / N / D; 1.6 76 54 / 2.3 77 54 / 3.5 77 55 / 11 75 56 / 9.5 74 56 / 5 73 55 / 4 74 54 / 4.1 74 55 / 6.1 74 55 / 10 74 55 / 6.4 74 55 / 3.3 75 54; █ Average max. and min. temperatures in °F; █ Precipitation totals in inches
SW: Tibacuy – 1647 m Climate chart (precipitation, max. and min. temperature): J / F / M / A / M / J / J / A / S / O / N / D; 72 24 15 / 90 24 15 / 109 25 16 / 170 24 16 / 155 24 16 / 88 23 15 / 57 24 16 / 52 24 16 / 80 24 15 / 214 23 15 / 216 23 15 / 100 23 15; █ Average max. and min. temperatures in °C; █ Precipitation totals in mm; Source: Climate-data.org – Tibacuy; Imperial conversion; J / F / M / A / M / J / J / A / S / O / N / D; 2.8 75 59 / 3.5 76 60 / 4.3 76 61 / 6.7 75 61 / 6.1 74 61 / 3.5 74 60 / 2.2 75 60 / 2 75 60 / 3.1 76 59 / 8.4 74 59 / 8.5 73 59 / 3.9 74 59; █ Average max. and min. temperatures in °F; █ Precipitation totals in inches			SE: Ubalá – 1949 m Climate chart (precipitation, max. and min. temperature): J / F / M / A / M / J / J / A / S / O / N / D; 47 23 11 / 93 24 12 / 136 24 13 / 216 23 14 / 290 22 14 / 360 21 13 / 332 21 13 / 276 21 13 / 205 22 12 / 188 22 13 / 132 23 13 / 72 23 12; █ Average max. and min. temperatures in °C; █ Precipitation totals in mm; Source: Climate-data.org – Ubalá; Imperial conversion; J / F / M / A / M / J / J / A / S / O / N / D; 1.9 74 52 / 3.7 74 54 / 5.4 74 56 / 8.5 73 57 / 11 72 57 / 14 70 56 / 13 70 55 / 11 70 55 / 8.1 71 54 / 7.4 72 55 / 5.2 73 55 / 2.8 73 54; █ Average max. and min. temperatures in °F; █ Precipitation totals in inches
Bacatá – 2700 m Climate chart (precipitation, max. and min. temperature): J / F / M / A / M / J / J / A / S / O / N / D; 34 19 4 / 46 19 4 / 67 19 7 / 113 19 7 / 102 18 8 / 63 18 9 / 47 18 8 / 47 18 8 / 56 18 7 / 119 18 7 / 112 18 8 / 60 19 5; █ Average max. and min. temperatures in °C; █ Precipitation totals in mm; Source: Climate-data.org – Bogotá; Imperial conversion; J / F / M / A / M / J / J / A / S / O / N / D; 1.3 67 40 / 1.8 67 38 / 2.6 67 44 / 4.4 66 45 / 4 65 47 / 2.5 64 48 / 1.9 64 46 / 1.9 64 46 / 2.2 65 45 / 4.7 65 44 / 4.4 65 46 / 2.4 66 41; █ Average max. and min. temperatures in °F; █ Precipitation totals in inches	Hunza – 2820 m Climate chart (precipitation, max. and min. temperature): J / F / M / A / M / J / J / A / S / O / N / D; 23 19 7 / 30 19 7 / 64 19 8 / 116 18 9 / 108 18 9 / 92 16 8 / 70 16 8 / 69 17 8 / 72 17 8 / 122 17 8 / 108 18 8 / 43 18 7; █ Average max. and min. temperatures in °C; █ Precipitation totals in mm; Source: Climate-data.org – Tunja; Imperial conversion; J / F / M / A / M / J / J / A / S / O / N / D; 0.9 66 44 / 1.2 66 45 / 2.5 67 47 / 4.6 65 48 / 4.3 64 48 / 3.6 61 47 / 2.8 61 46 / 2.7 62 46 / 2.8 63 46 / 4.8 63 47 / 4.3 64 47 / 1.7 65 45; █ Average max. and min. temperatures in °F; █ Precipitation totals in inches	Suamox – 2569 m Climate chart (precipitation, max. and min. temperature): J / F / M / A / M / J / J / A / S / O / N / D; 19 22 8 / 31 22 9 / 58 22 9 / 114 21 10 / 107 20 10 / 65 19 9 / 49 19 9 / 51 20 9 / 64 20 9 / 116 20 10 / 89 21 9 / 35 21 8; █ Average max. and min. temperatures in °C; █ Precipitation totals in mm; Source: Climate-data.org – Sogamoso; Imperial conversion; J / F / M / A / M / J / J / A / S / O / N / D; 0.7 71 47 / 1.2 72 47 / 2.3 72 48 / 4.5 69 50 / 4.2 68 50 / 2.6 67 49 / 1.9 66 47 / 2 67 48 / 2.5 68 48 / 4.6 68 49 / 3.5 69 49 / 1.4 70 47; █ Average max. and min. temperatures in °F; █ Precipitation totals in inches	Tundama – 2590 m Climate chart (precipitation, max. and min. temperature): J / F / M / A / M / J / J / A / S / O / N / D; 21 21 7 / 43 22 8 / 65 22 8 / 123 20 9 / 126 20 9 / 75 19 9 / 54 19 8 / 54 19 8 / 74 20 8 / 143 19 9 / 92 20 9 / 42 21 7; █ Average max. and min. temperatures in °C; █ Precipitation totals in mm; Source: Climate-data.org – Duitama; Imperial conversion; J / F / M / A / M / J / J / A / S / O / N / D; 0.8 70 45 / 1.7 71 46 / 2.6 71 46 / 4.8 69 49 / 5 67 49 / 3 66 47 / 2.1 66 46 / 2.1 67 46 / 2.9 67 46 / 5.6 67 48 / 3.6 68 47 / 1.7 69 45; █ Average max. and min. temperatures in °F; █ Precipitation totals in inches
The climates (Af-Cfb-Cwb) of the geographic (NW, NE, SW and SE) and topographic extremes and for the four main settlements of the Muisca Confederation situated on the Altiplano, from SW to NE; Bacatá, Hunza, Suamox and Tundama are rather constant over the year with wetter periods in April–May and October–November

== Muisca Confederations ==
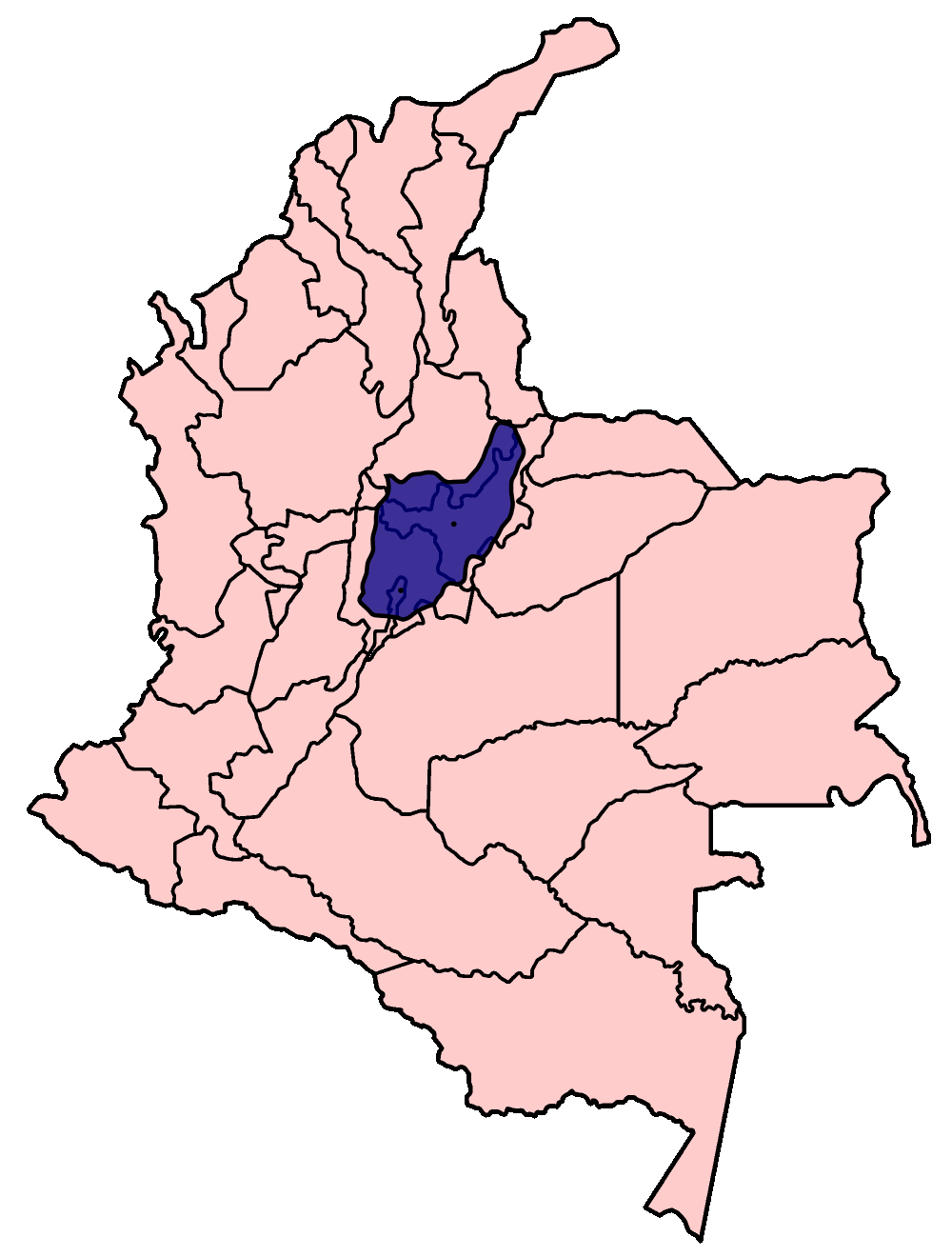
Location of the Muisca Confederation on the map of the Republic of Colombia.

The Muiscas lived in the Andes Orientales in a territory of approximately 22.000 km^{2}. At the time of the Spanish Conquest, four confederations existed in their territory (Bogotá, Tunja, Duitama, Sogamoso). According to colonial documents, the confederations of Sogamoso and Duitama were independent of Tunja and had great importance. Political power was not based on economic or political subordination but recognition of certain authorities, sometimes multiple at a time. The size of muisca population remains debated. The most powerful chiefdom at the time of the Spanish conquest was Bogotá. Additionally, there were independent chiefdoms in the north-west, not affilitiated to any confederation.

Muisca settlements were organised around the cacique's enclosure or cercado. Roads were present to connect the settlements with each other and with the surrounding indigenous groups, of which the Guane and Lache to the north, the Panche and Muzo to the west and Guayupe, Achagua and Tegua to the east were the most important.

=== History ===
==== Prehistory ====
Early Amerindian settlers led a hunter-gatherer life among still extant megafauna living in cool habitats around Pleistocene lakes, of which the humedales in Bogotá, Lake Suesca, Lake Fúquene and Lake Herrera are notable examples. Multiple evidences of late Pleistocene to middle Holocene population of the Bogotá savanna, the high plateau in the Colombian Andes, have been found to date. As is common with caves and rock shelters, Tequendama was inhabited from around 11,000 years BP, and continuing into the prehistorical, Herrera and Muisca periods, making it the oldest site of Colombia, together with El Abra (12,500 BP), located north of Zipaquirá and Tibitó, located within the boundaries of Tocancipá (11,740 BP). The oldest human remains and the oldest complete skeleton were discovered at Tequendama and has been named "Hombre del Tequendama" or Homo Tequendama. Other artefacts have been found in Gachalá (9100 BP), Sueva (Junín) and Zipacón. Just west of the Altiplano, the oldest archaeological remains were found; in Pubenza, part of Tocaima and have been dated at 16,000 years Before Present.

==== Pre-Columbian era ====
Timeline of inhabitation of the Altiplano Cundiboyacense, Colombia
Altiplano Muisca Confederation

===== Herrera Period =====
Period name	Start age	End age
Herrera	800 BCE	800
Early Muisca	800	1200
Late Muisca	1200	1537
Kruschek, 2003

The Herrera Period is a historical period named after the La Herrera lake, south of Bogotá, it took place approximately between 800 BCE to 800 AD. However, current academic consensus considers the period to have ranged from 400 B.C. to 1000 A.D., with regional variations. The muisca arrival to the Altiplano Cundibyacense most likely pre-dated the beginning of the Herrera period. However, the exact date of their arrival is unknown, and the least oldest date would be the middle of the first millennium B.C.

Generally, the Herrera period is characterized by agriculture, ceramic traditions and the use of salt sources. The political organisation and level of social complexity during the Herrera period is uncertain.

===== Muisca =====
The period named "Muisca" is separated by scholars into "early muisca" (approximately 1000–1200 A.D.) and "late muisca" (apr. 1200–1600). This period is associated with the rise of muisca chiefdoms. Through the construction of monolithic structures, elites acquired an ideological more than a direct economic control. The reasons for the expansion of chiefdoms are uncertain. According to Gerardo Reichel-Dolmatoff, the north-western, independent chiefdoms are representative of the state of Muisca society prior to the creation of confederations. Possibly, matrimonial alliances, conducted independently of the "territory" assigned to each chiefdom, played an important role. Two traditions of chroniclers reported different versions of Bogotá expansion: According to Juan Rodríguez Freyle, Bogotá's expansion began just one year before the Spanish conquest, after having revolted against the previously dominant chiefdom of Guatavita. On the other hand, Lucas Fernández de Piedrahíta related Bogotá's expansion in the course of 67 years, as the result of various military campaigns led by different chiefs. According to Martha Herrera Angel, the colonial-era writings, while filled with exaggerations and misunderstandings, contain a core of historical truth.

The concept of gue ("house") was essential for muisca chiefs to secure their legitimacy, which was based on rules of succession and a certain degree of popular consent. Their role was to redistribute an accumulated surplus of goods, not to accumulate them. The existence of religious specialists can be explained by the need to maintain the equilibrium of the world.

The people used a decimal counting system, based on the digits of the hand. Their system went from 1 to 10 and for higher numerations they used the prefix quihicha or qhicha, which means "foot" in their Chibcha language Muysccubun. Eleven became thus "foot one", twelve "foot two", etc. As in the other pre-Columbian civilizations, the number 20 was special. It was the total number of all body extremities; fingers and toes. The Muisca used two forms to express twenty: "foot ten"; quihícha ubchihica or their exclusive word gueta, derived from gue, which means "house". Numbers between 20 and 30 were counted gueta asaqui ata ("twenty plus one"; 21), gueta asaqui ubchihica ("twenty plus ten"; 30). Larger numbers were counted as multiples of twenty; gue-bosa ("20 times 2"; 40), gue-hisca ("20 times 5"; 100). The Muisca script consisted of hieroglyphs, only used for numerals. Gold was not the main object of prestige, but had religious significance, as chiefs preferred exotic clothing and sumptuous palisades to show their power. There was no currency among the Muiscas.

== Territorial organization ==
History of the Muisca
Altiplano	Muisca	Art	Architecture	Astronomy	Cuisine	El Dorado	Subsistence	Women	Conquest

=== Bacatá ===
The zipa ruled over the Bogotá savanna

- Capital – Bacatá
- Area – 5,430 square kilometres (2,100 sq mi)
- Average elevation – 2,470 metres (8,100 ft)
- Last rulers – zipas Tisquesusa, Sagipa
- Date of conquest – 20 April 1537 (Funza) – Jiménez & Pérez de Quesada
- First city – 6 August 1538 (Bogotá) – Gonzalo Jiménez de Quesada

Municipality	Department bold is capital	Ruler(s) bold is seat	Altitude urban centre (m)	Surface area (km^{2})	Remarks	Map
Bacatá	Cundinamarca	zipa	2640	1587	Muisca mummy found Important market town Petrographs found	
Bojacá	Cundinamarca	zipa	2598	109	Lake Herrera; Petrographs found	
Cajicá	Cundinamarca	zipa	2558	50.4		
La Calera	Cundinamarca	zipa	2718	317	Petrographs found	
Cáqueza	Cundinamarca	zipa	1746	38		
Chía	Cundinamarca	zipa	2564	80	Moon Temple; Herrera site Petrographs found	
Choachí	Cundinamarca	zipa	1923	223	Choachí Stone found	
Chocontá	Cundinamarca	zipa	2655	301.1	Important market town Battle of Chocontá (~1490); Fortification between zipa & zaque	
Cogua	Cundinamarca	zipa	2600	113	Muisca ceramics production Petrographs found	
Cota	Cundinamarca	zipa	2566	55	Petrographs found Still Muisca people living	
Cucunubá	Cundinamarca	zipa	2590	112	Petrographs found	
Facatativá	Cundinamarca	zipa	2586	158	Piedras del Tunjo	
Funza	Cundinamarca	zipa	2548	70	Important market town	
Gachancipá	Cundinamarca	zipa	2568	44	Muisca mummy found Muisca ceramics production	
Guasca	Cundinamarca	zipa	2710	346	Siecha Lakes; Muisca ceramics production Petrographs found	
Madrid	Cundinamarca	zipa	2554	120.5	Lake Herrera; Petrographs found	
Mosquera	Cundinamarca	zipa	2516	107	Lake Herrera; Petrographs found	
Nemocón	Cundinamarca	zipa	2585	98.1	Muisca salt mines Preceramic site Checua; Petrographs found	
Pacho	Cundinamarca	zipa	2136	403.3	Important market town	
Pasca	Cundinamarca	zipa	2180	246.24	Battle of Pasca (~1470); Muisca raft found	
El Rosal	Cundinamarca	zipa	2685	86.48		
San Antonio del Tequendama	Cundinamarca	zipa	1540	82	Tequendama Falls; Fortification against Panche; Petrographs found	
Sesquilé	Cundinamarca	zipa	2595	141	Lake Guatavita; Minor Muisca salt mines	
Sibaté	Cundinamarca	zipa	2700	125.6	Petrographs found	
Soacha	Cundinamarca	zipa	2565	187	Preceramic site Tequendama; Herrera site Muisca ceramics production Petrographs found	
Sopó	Cundinamarca	zipa	2650	111.5	Herrera site	
Subachoque	Cundinamarca	zipa	2663	211.53	Petrographs found	
Suesca	Cundinamarca	zipa	2584	177	150 Muisca mummies found Lake Suesca; Muisca ceramics production Important market town Petrographs found	
Sutatausa	Cundinamarca	zipa	2550	67	Petrographs found	
Tabio	Cundinamarca	zipa	2569	74.5	Hot springs used by the Muisca	
Tausa	Cundinamarca	zipa	2931	204	Muisca salt mines Petrographs found	
Tena	Cundinamarca	zipa	1384	55	Fortification against Panche; Petrographs found	
Tenjo	Cundinamarca	zipa	2587	108	Petrographs found	
Tibacuy	Cundinamarca	zipa & Panche	1647	84.4	Border with Panche; Fortification against Panche & Sutagao; Petrographs found	
Tocancipá	Cundinamarca	zipa	2605	73.51	Preceramic site Tibitó; Muisca ceramics production Important market town Petrographs found	
Zipaquirá	Cundinamarca	zipa	2650	197	El Abra; Muisca salt mines Important market town Petrographs and petroglyphs found	
Fúquene	Cundinamarca	zipa zaque	2750	90	Lake Fúquene	
Simijaca	Cundinamarca	zipa (1490–1537)	2559	107	Conquered by zipa Saguamanchica upon zaque Michuá (~1490)	
Susa	Cundinamarca	zipa (1490–1537)	2655	86	Conquered by zipa Saguamanchica upon zaque Michuá (~1490); Lake Fúquene	
Ubaté	Cundinamarca	zipa (1490–1537)	2556	102	Conquered by zipa Saguamanchica upon zaque Michuá (~1490); Muisca mummy found	
Zipacón	Cundinamarca	zipa	2550	70	Agriculture; Place of meditation for the zipa Petrographs found	

=== Chipazaque ===
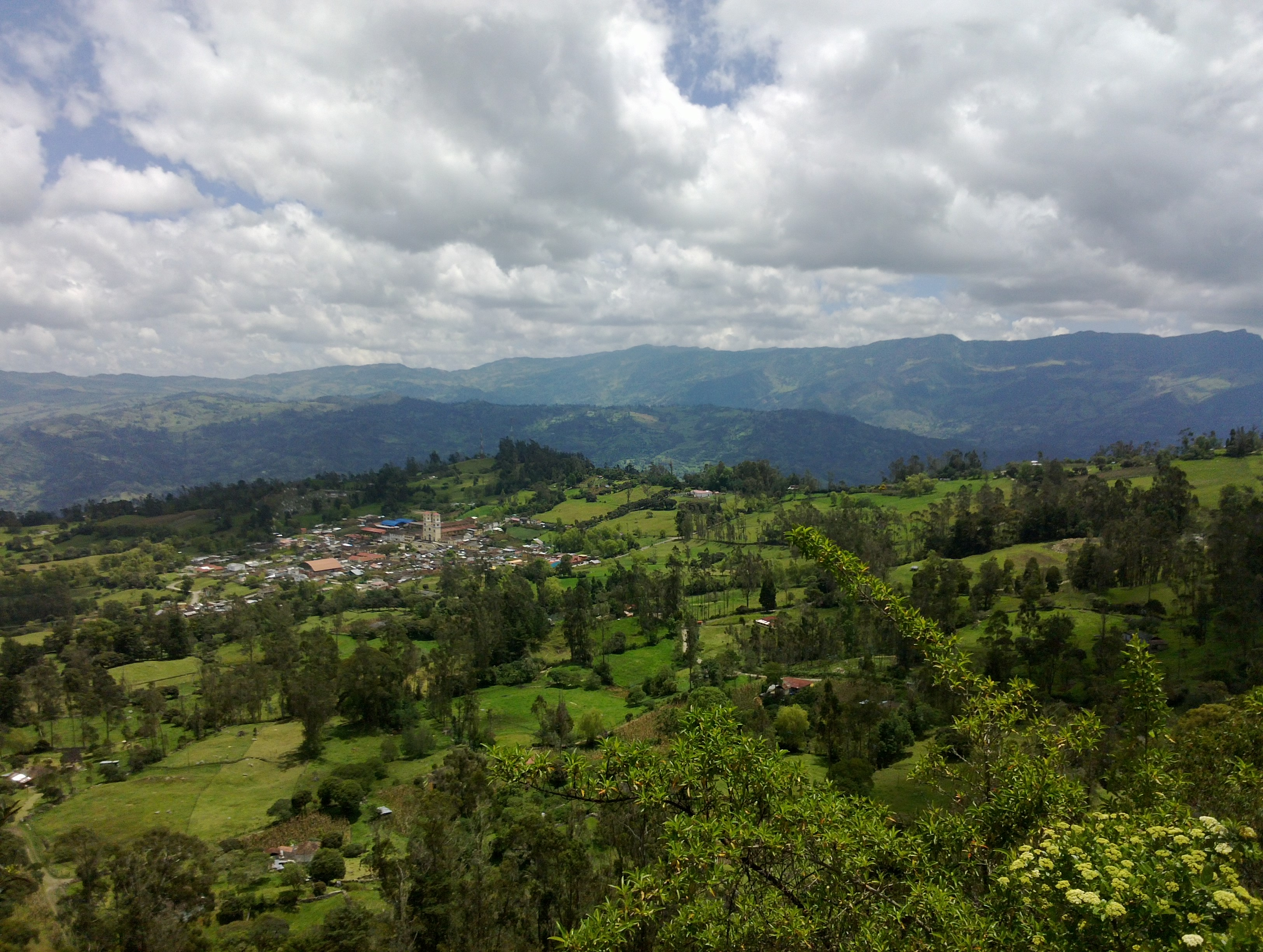
Landscape of Chipazaque

Municipality	Department	Ruler(s)	Altitude (m)	Surface area (km^{2})	Remarks	Map
Junín	Cundinamarca	chipazaque	2300	337	Shared between zipa and zaque Petrographs found	

=== Hunza ===
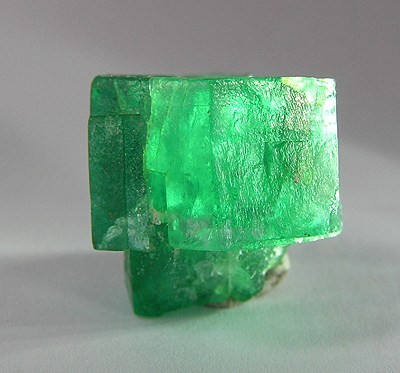
The Muisca were bordered to the west by the Emerald People

- Capital – Hunza
- Area – 4,700 square kilometres (1,800 sq mi)
- Average elevation – 2,270 metres (7,450 ft)
- Last rulers – zaques Quemuenchatocha, Aquiminzaque
- Date of conquest – 20 August 1537 (Hunza) – Jiménez & Pérez de Quesada
- First city – 6 August 1539 (Tunja) – Gonzalo Suárez Rendón

Municipality	Department bold is capital	Ruler(s) bold is seat	Altitude (m)	Surface area (km^{2})	Remarks	Map
Hunza	Boyacá	zaque	2820	121.4	Hunzahúa Well; Cojines del Zaque; Goranchacha Temple; Muisca mummy found Important market town Petrographs found	
Boyacá	Boyacá	zaque	2420	48		
Buenavista	Boyacá	zaque	2100	125	Border with Muzo; Nose piece and pectoral found, dated at 620 and 990 AD respectively	
Chinavita	Boyacá	zaque	1763	148		
Chíquiza	Boyacá	zaque	2900	119.52	Lake Iguaque	
Chitaraque	Boyacá	zaque	1575	157.65		
Chivatá	Boyacá	zaque	2903	56		
Ciénega	Boyacá	zaque	2460	73		
Cucaita	Boyacá	zaque	2650	43.58		
Gachantivá	Boyacá	zaque	2450	66	Muisca mummy found Muisca copper mines	
Garagoa	Boyacá	zaque	1650	191.75		
Macanal	Boyacá	zaque	1680	199.5	Border with Tegua	
Motavita	Boyacá	zaque	2690	62	Coca market town Petrographs found	
Oicatá	Boyacá	zaque	2815	59		
Pachavita	Boyacá	zaque	1985	68		
Ramiriquí	Boyacá	zaque	2325	146.5	Place of death of Quemuenchatocha; Important ceramics production Petrographs found	
Sáchica	Boyacá	zaque	2150	62.4	Petrographs found	
Samacá	Boyacá	zaque	2660	172.9		
San Miguel de Sema	Boyacá	zaque	2615	90	Lake Fúquene	
Siachoque	Boyacá	zaque	2760	125		
Somondoco	Boyacá	zaque	1670	58.7	Muisca emerald mines Important market town	
Sutamarchán	Boyacá	zaque	1800	102	Muisca ceramics production	
Tinjacá	Boyacá	zaque	2175	79.3	Muisca ceramics production	
Tipacoque	Boyacá	zaque	1850	72.1	Chicamocha Canyon	
Turmequé	Boyacá	zaque	2389	106	Important market town Fortification between zipa & zaque	
Villa de Leyva	Boyacá	zaque	2149	128	El Infiernito; Lake Iguaque; Muisca mummy found Important market town	
Sora	Boyacá	zaque	2650	42		
Soracá	Boyacá	zaque	2942	57		
Sotaquirá	Boyacá	zaque	2860	288.65		
Sutatenza	Boyacá	zaque	1890	41.26		
Tibaná	Boyacá	zaque	2115	121.76	Petrographs found	
Togüí	Boyacá	zaque	1650	118		
Tuta	Boyacá	zaque	2600	165		
Ventaquemada	Boyacá	zaque	2630	159.3		
Viracachá	Boyacá	zaque	2520	68		
Zetaquirá	Boyacá	zaque	1665	262		
Almeida	Boyacá	zaque	1925	57.98		
La Capilla	Boyacá	zaque	1750	57.26		
Jenesano	Boyacá	zaque	2076	59		
Nuevo Colón	Boyacá	zaque	2500	51		
Rondón	Boyacá	zaque	2075	158		
Lenguazaque	Cundinamarca	zaque	2589	15.36		
Machetá	Cundinamarca	zaque	2094	229.35	Petrographs found	
Tibiritá	Cundinamarca	zaque	1980	57.2	Petrographs found	
Villapinzón	Cundinamarca	zaque	2715	249		

=== Iraca ===
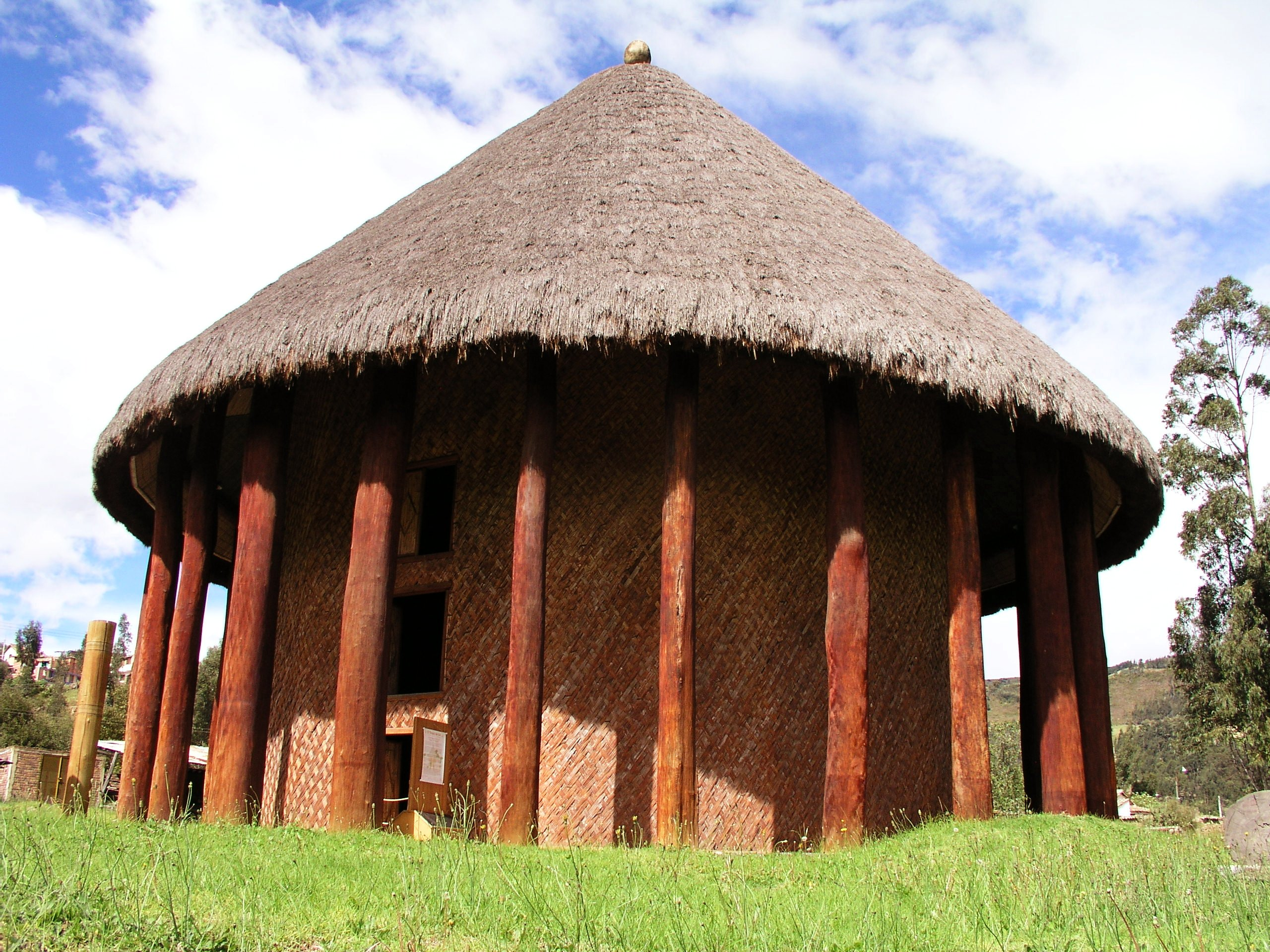
The Sun Temple was the seat of the iraca

- Capital – Suamox
- Area – 4,163 square kilometres (1,607 sq mi)
- Average elevation – 2,630 metres (8,630 ft)
- Last ruler – iraca Sugamuxi
- Date of conquest – Early September 1537 (Sogamoso) – Jiménez & Pérez de Quesada
- Important settlements – Suamox, Busbanzá, Firavitoba, Gámeza and Tota
- Archaeological remains – mummies, Sun Temple reconstruction, Lake Tota

Municipality	Department	Ruler(s) bold is seat	Altitude (m)	Surface area (km^{2})	Remarks	Map
Suamox	Boyacá	iraca Nompanim; Sugamuxi	2569	208.54	Sun Temple; Muisca mummy found Muisca carbon mines	
Aquitania	Boyacá	iraca	3030	943	Lake Tota	
Busbanzá	Boyacá	iraca	2472	22.5	Elector of new iraca	
Cuítiva	Boyacá	iraca	2750	43	Lake Tota; Statue of Bochica	
Firavitoba	Boyacá	iraca	2500	109.9	Elector of new iraca	
Gámeza	Boyacá	iraca	2750	88	Herrera site Muisca mummy found Minor Muisca salt mines Muisca carbon mines Petrographs found	
Iza	Boyacá	iraca	2560	34	Herrera site Lake Tota; Petrographs found	
Mongua	Boyacá	iraca	2975	365.5	Petrographs found	
Monguí	Boyacá	iraca	2900	81	Petroglyphs; Birthplaces (Tortolitas)	
Pesca	Boyacá	iraca	2858	282		
Tasco	Boyacá	iraca	2530	167	Muisca mummy found	
Toca	Boyacá	iraca	2810	165		
Tota	Boyacá	iraca	2870	314	Lake Tota	
Socotá	Boyacá	iraca Tundama	2443	600.11	Muisca mummy found	
Tibasosa	Boyacá	Tundama iraca	2538	94.3		

=== Tundama ===
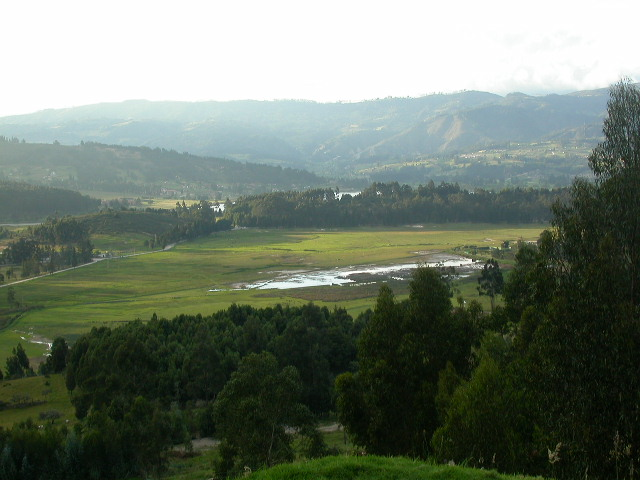
The area around Tundama was filled with small lakes of which some bloody evidences remain

- Capital – Tundama
- Area – 2,920 square kilometres (1,130 sq mi)
- Average elevation – 2,470 metres (8,100 ft)
- Last ruler – Tundama
- Date of conquest – Late December 1539 (Duitama) – Baltasar Maldonado
- Important settlements – Tundama, Onzaga, Soatá, Chitagoto (now Paz de Río)

Municipality	Department	Ruler(s) bold is seat	Altitude (m)	Surface area (km^{2})	Remarks	Map
Tundama	Boyacá	Tundama	2590	266.93	Seat of Tundama; In ancient lake	
Onzaga	Santander	Tundama	1960	486.76	Important for wool and cotton production	
Cerinza	Boyacá	Tundama	2750	61.63	Monument to the Muisca	
Paz de Río	Boyacá	Tundama	2200	116	Coca market town	
Paipa	Boyacá	Tundama	2525	305.924	Thermal springs	
Sativanorte	Boyacá	Tundama	2600	184	Herrera site	
Sativasur	Boyacá	Tundama	2600	81	Muisca mummy SO10-IX found Herrera site	
Soatá	Boyacá	Tundama	1950	136	Herrera site Coca market town	
Belén	Boyacá	Tundama	2650	83.6	Petrographs found	
Corrales	Boyacá	Tundama	2470	60.85		
Floresta	Boyacá	Tundama	2506	86		
Nobsa	Boyacá	Tundama	2510	55.39		
Santa Rosa de Viterbo	Boyacá	Tundama	2753	107		
Susacón	Boyacá	Tundama	2480	191		
Tibasosa	Boyacá	Tundama iraca	2538	94.3		
Socotá	Boyacá	iraca Tundama	2443	600.11	Muisca mummy found	

=== Independent caciques ===
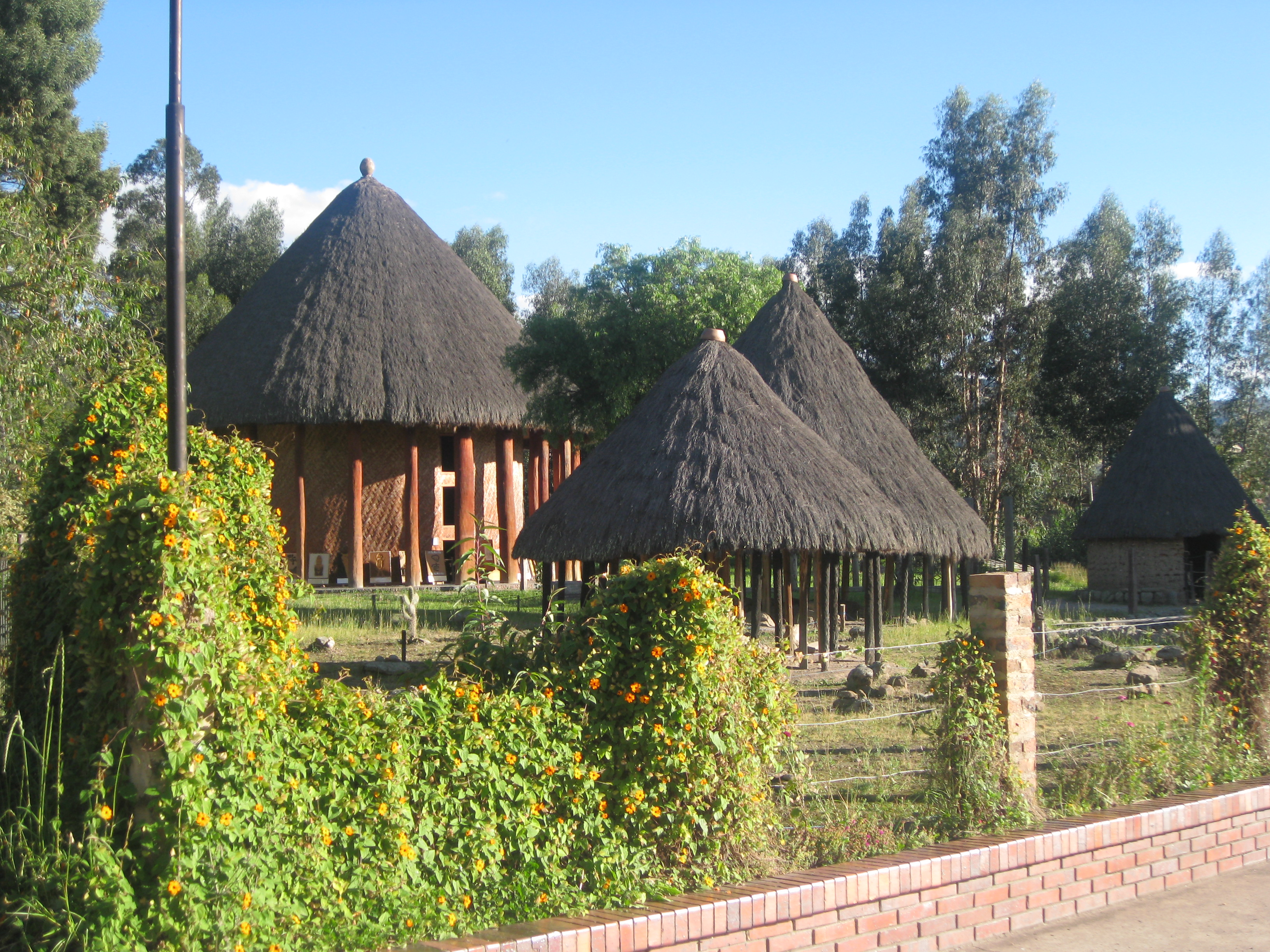
Independent caciques headed small communities

- Capital – none
- Area – 3,080 square kilometres (1,190 sq mi)
- Average elevation – 2,140 metres (7,020 ft)
- Important caciques – Guatavita, Ubaté, Chiquinquirá, Ubaque, Tenza, Vélez

Municipality bold is major cacique	Department	Ruler(s)	Altitude (m)	Surface area (km^{2})	Remarks	Map
Vélez	Santander	cacique	2050	271.34		
Chipatá	Santander	cacique	1820	94.17	First town conquered by the Spanish	
Güepsa	Santander	cacique	1540	33.08	Border with Guane; Border with Yarigui	
Charalá	Santander	cacique	1290	411	Border with Guane	
Arcabuco	Boyacá	cacique	2739	155	Statue honouring the Muisca warriors	
Betéitiva	Boyacá	cacique	2575	123		
Boavita	Boyacá	cacique	2114	159	Muisca mummy found	
Chiquinquirá	Boyacá	cacique	2556	133		
Cómbita	Boyacá	cacique	2825	149		
Covarachía	Boyacá	cacique	2320	103	Herrera site	
Guateque	Boyacá	cacique	1815	36.04	Religious rituals at Guatoc hill	
Guayatá	Boyacá	cacique	1767	112	Muisca money (tejuelo) found	
Moniquirá	Boyacá	cacique	1669	220	Muisca mummy found Muisca copper mines	
Pisba	Boyacá	cacique	2400	469.12	Muisca mummy found	
Ráquira	Boyacá	cacique	2150	233	Muisca ceramics production	
Saboyá	Boyacá	cacique	2600	246.9	Petrographs found	
Tópaga	Boyacá	cacique	2900	37	Muisca mummy found Muisca carbon mines	
Tutazá	Boyacá	cacique	1890	135	Muisca ceramics production	
Tenza	Boyacá	cacique	1600	51	Tenza Valley	
Chivor	Boyacá	cacique	1800	108.36	Muisca emerald mines	
Úmbita	Boyacá	cacique	2480	148.17		
Carmen de Carupa	Cundinamarca	cacique	2600	228	Tunjo found	
Guatavita	Cundinamarca	cacique	2680	247.3	Muisca ceramics production Main goldworking town Petrographs found	
Gachetá	Cundinamarca	cacique Guatavita	1745	262.2		
Guachetá	Cundinamarca	cacique	2688	177.45	Minor Muisca salt mines Petrographs found	
Manta	Cundinamarca	cacique	1924	105		
Ubaque	Cundinamarca	cacique	1867	104.96	Last public religious ritual (1563); Lake Ubaque	
Ubalá	Cundinamarca	cacique	1949	505	Muisca emerald mines	
Chipaque	Cundinamarca	cacique	2400	139.45	Petrographs found	
Fómeque	Cundinamarca	cacique	1895	555.7		
Quetame	Cundinamarca	cacique	1496	138.47		
Une	Cundinamarca	cacique	2376	221		
Fosca	Cundinamarca	cacique	2080	126.02	Fortification against Guayupe	

== Neighbouring indigenous groups ==
Yarigui	Guane		Lache	U'wa
Muzo				U'wa
Panche				Achagua
Sutagao		Guayupe	Tegua	Achagua
Cariban languages • Chibchan languages • Arawakan languages
Yarigui and Lache not shown on map • Tegua shown as Tecua • U'wa shown as Tunebo

- Panche
  - Cariban-speaking
  - frequent warfare
  - beaten in the Battle of Tocarema
  - pathways to gold
  - conquest by Hernán Venegas Carrillo (1543–44)
- Muzo or The Emerald people
  - Cariban-speaking
  - trading access to western neighbours
  - Furatena
  - pathways to gold
  - conquest by Luis Lanchero (1539–1559)
- Guane
  - Chibcha-speaking
  - producers of cotton for mantle making
  - producers of fruits
  - access to La Tora (Barrancabermeja); trading sea shells at Magdalena River
  - conquest by Martín Galeano (1539–1551)

== Sacred sites ==
The sacred sites of the Muisca Confederation were based in the Muisca religion and mythology. The Muisca were a highly religious people with their own beliefs on the origin of the Earth and life and human sacrifices were no exception to please the gods for good harvests and prosperity.

Lake Guatavita, Guatavita, was the location where the new zipa would be inaugurated. It became known with the Spanish conquerors as the site of El Dorado where the new zipa was covered in gold dust and installed as the new ruler of the southern Muisca.

In the legends of the Muisca, humankind originated in Lake Iguaque, Monquirá, when the goddess Bachué came out from the lake with a boy in her arms. When the boy grew, they populated the Earth. They are considered the ancestors of the human race. Finally, they disappeared unto the lake in the shape of snakes.

According to Muisca myths, the Tequendama Falls, outside Soacha, was the site where the first zipa Meicuchuca lost his lover who turned in a snake and disappeared in the waters of the Bogotá River.

El Infiernito, close to the present town of Villa de Leyva was a sacred site where the Muisca erected structures based on astronomical parameters.

=== Other sacred sites ===
- Sun Temple, Sogamoso
- Hunzahúa Well, Tunja
- Goranchacha Temple, Tunja
- Cojines del Zaque, Tunja
- Moon Temple, Chía
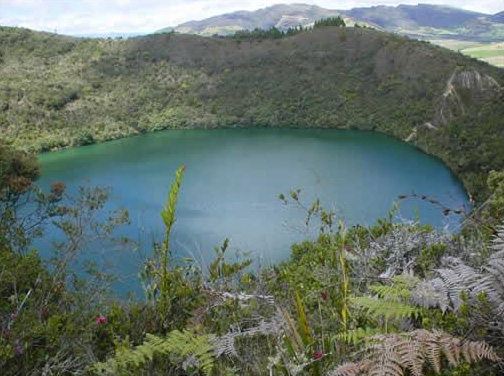
Lake Guatavita; site of El Dorado

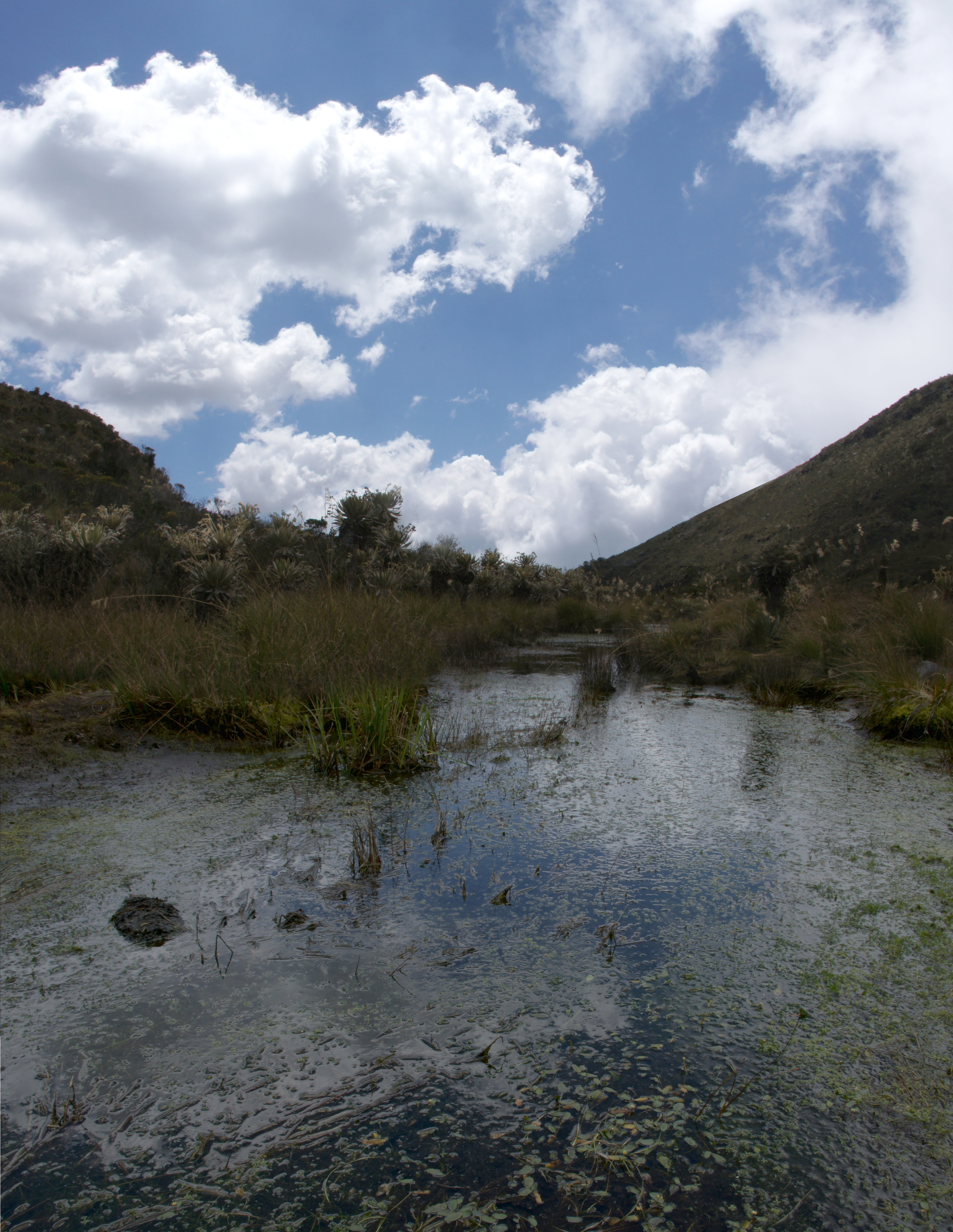
Lake Iguaque

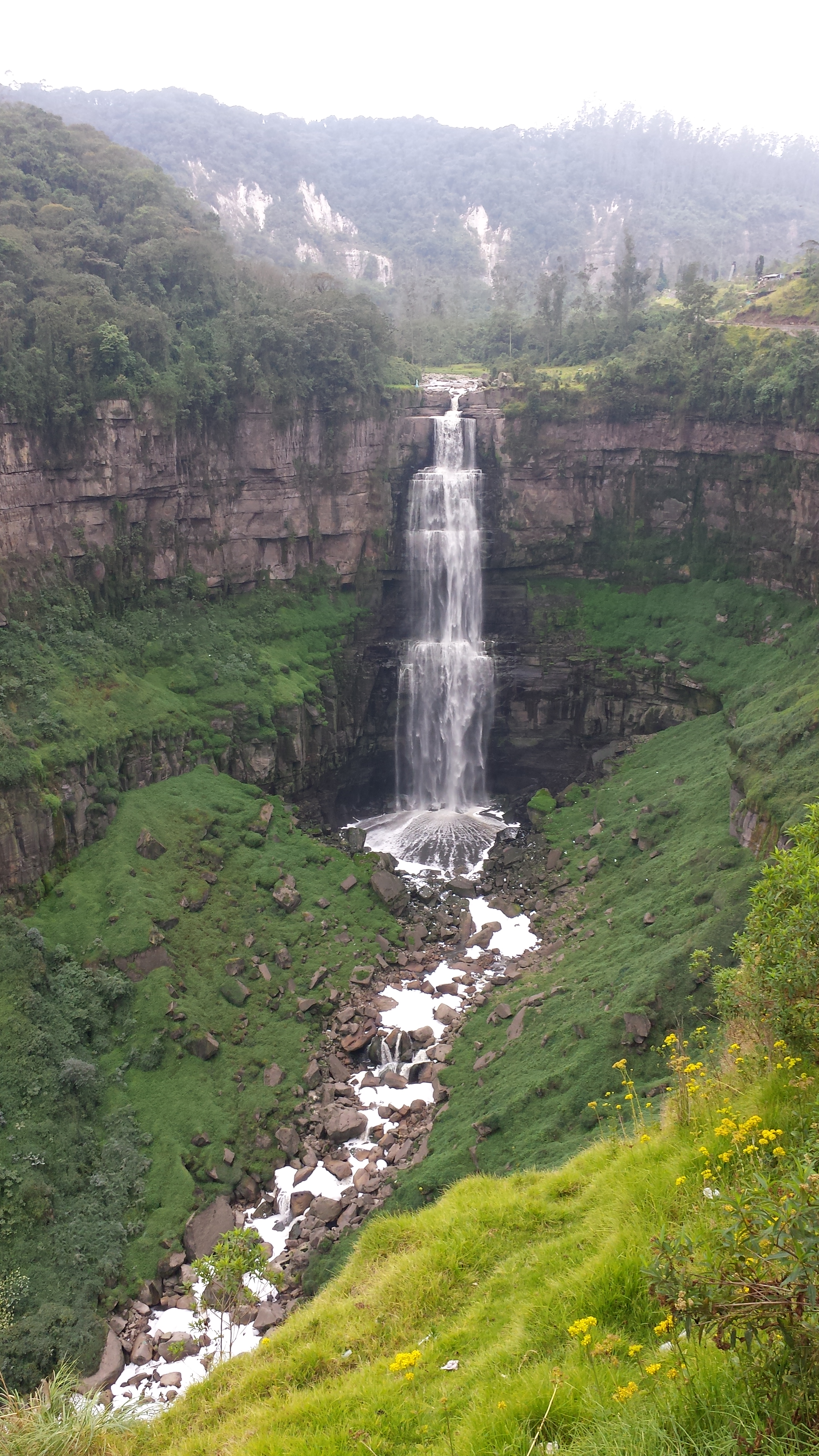
Tequendama Falls

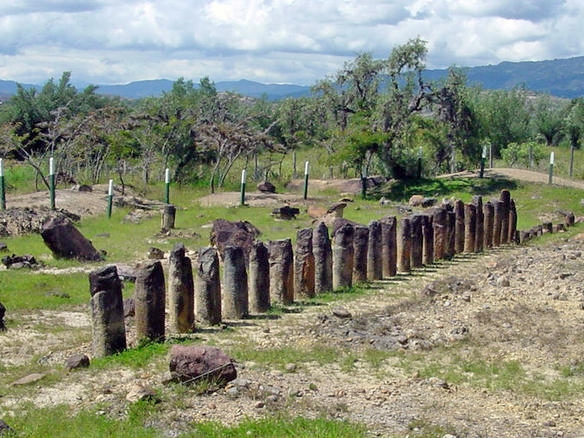
El Infiernito; astronomical site

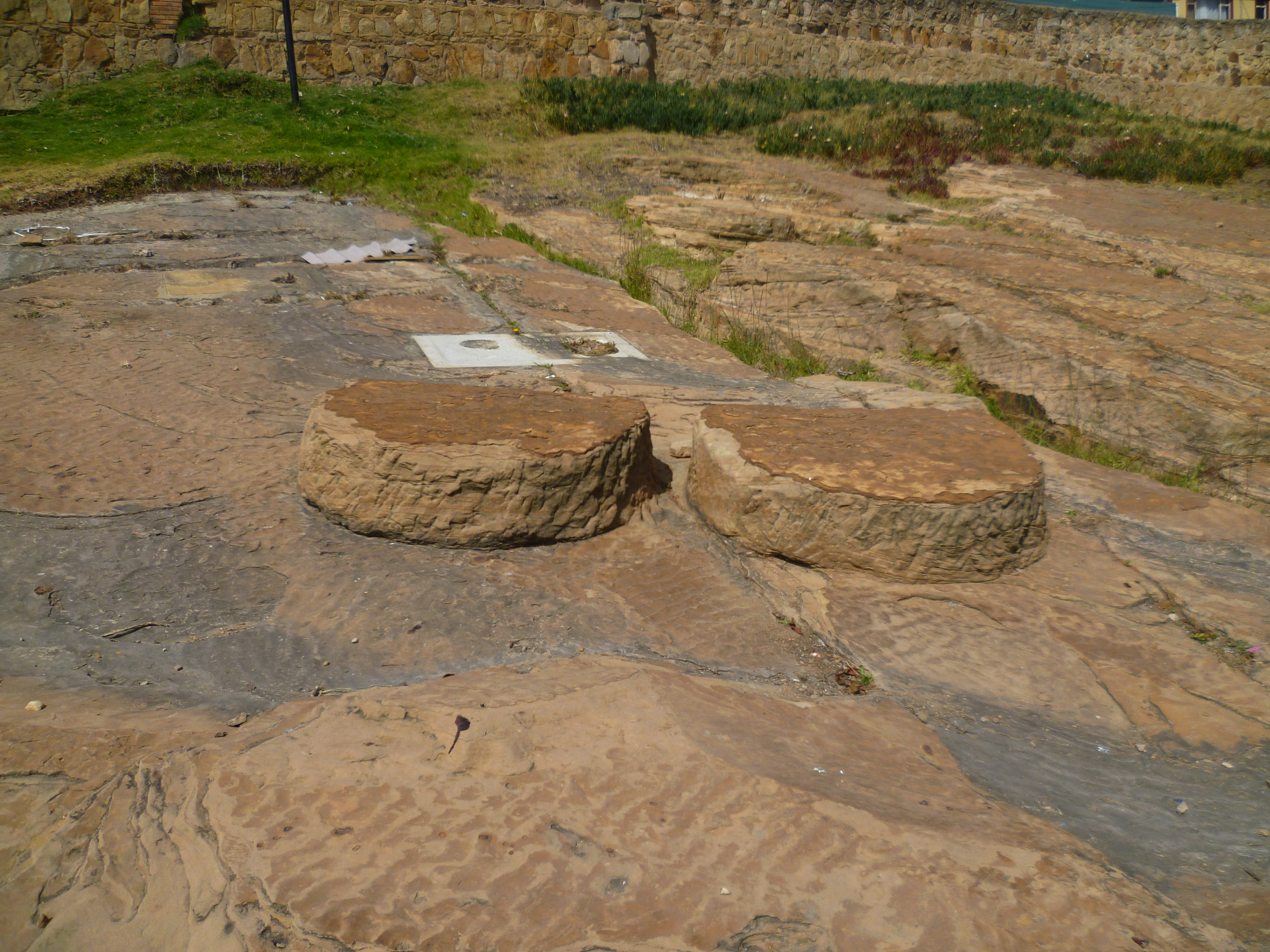
Cojines del Zaque

== Spanish conquests ==
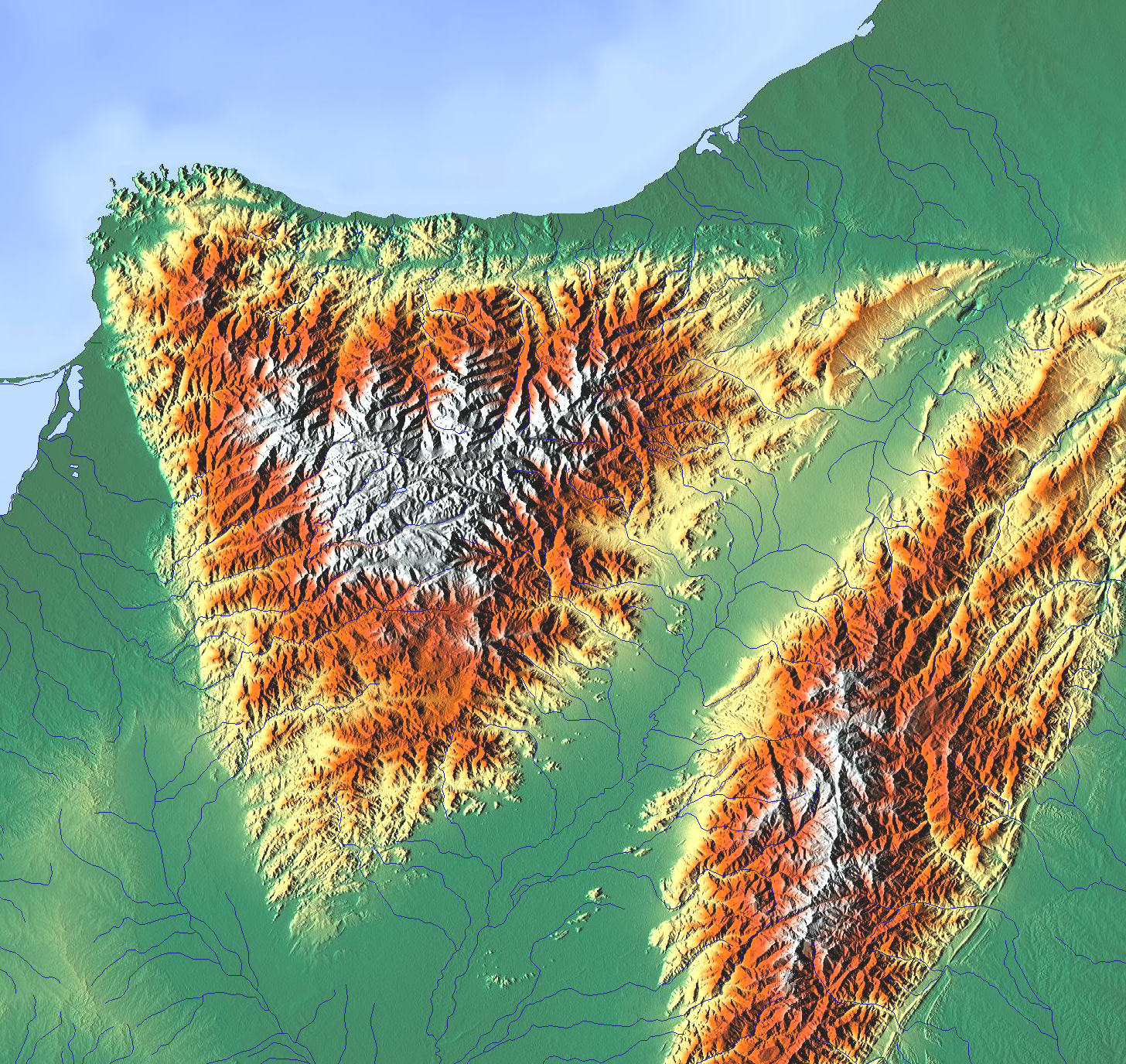
Sierra Nevada de Santa Marta

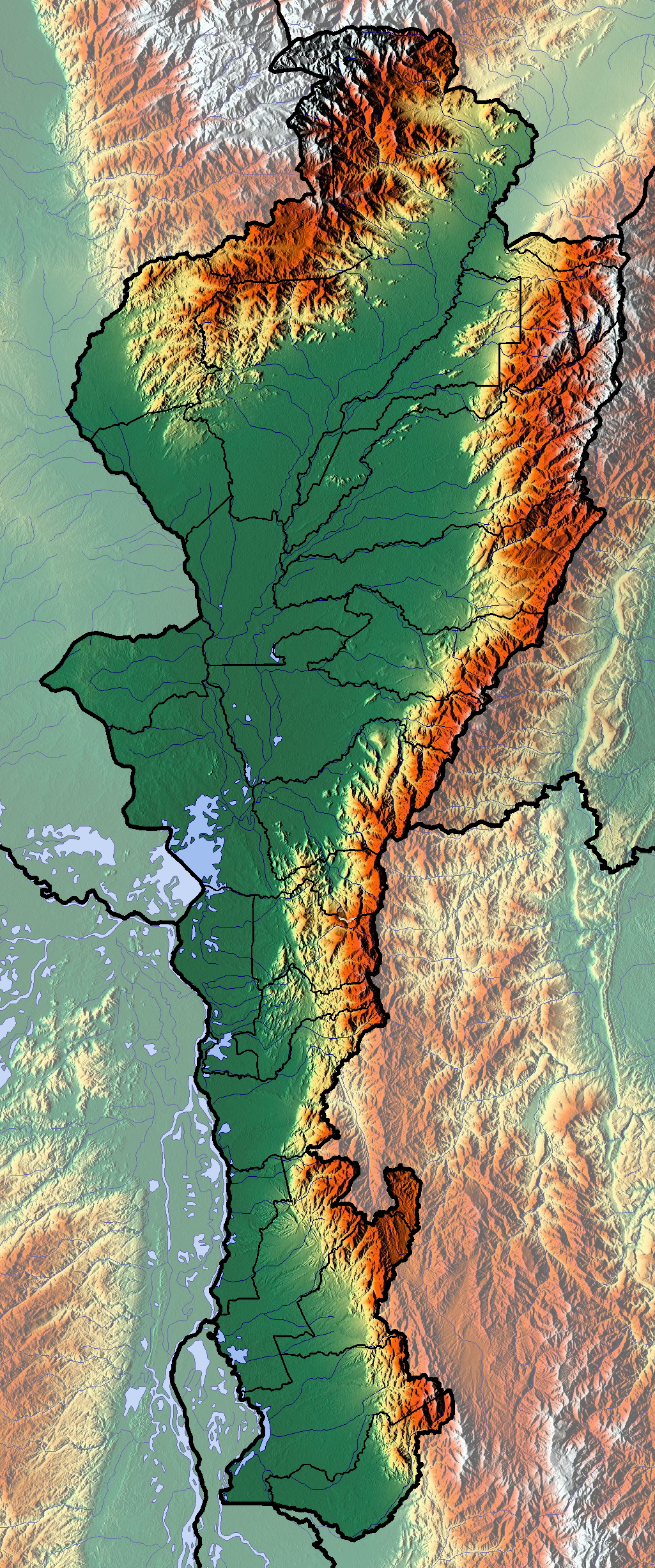
Topography Cesar

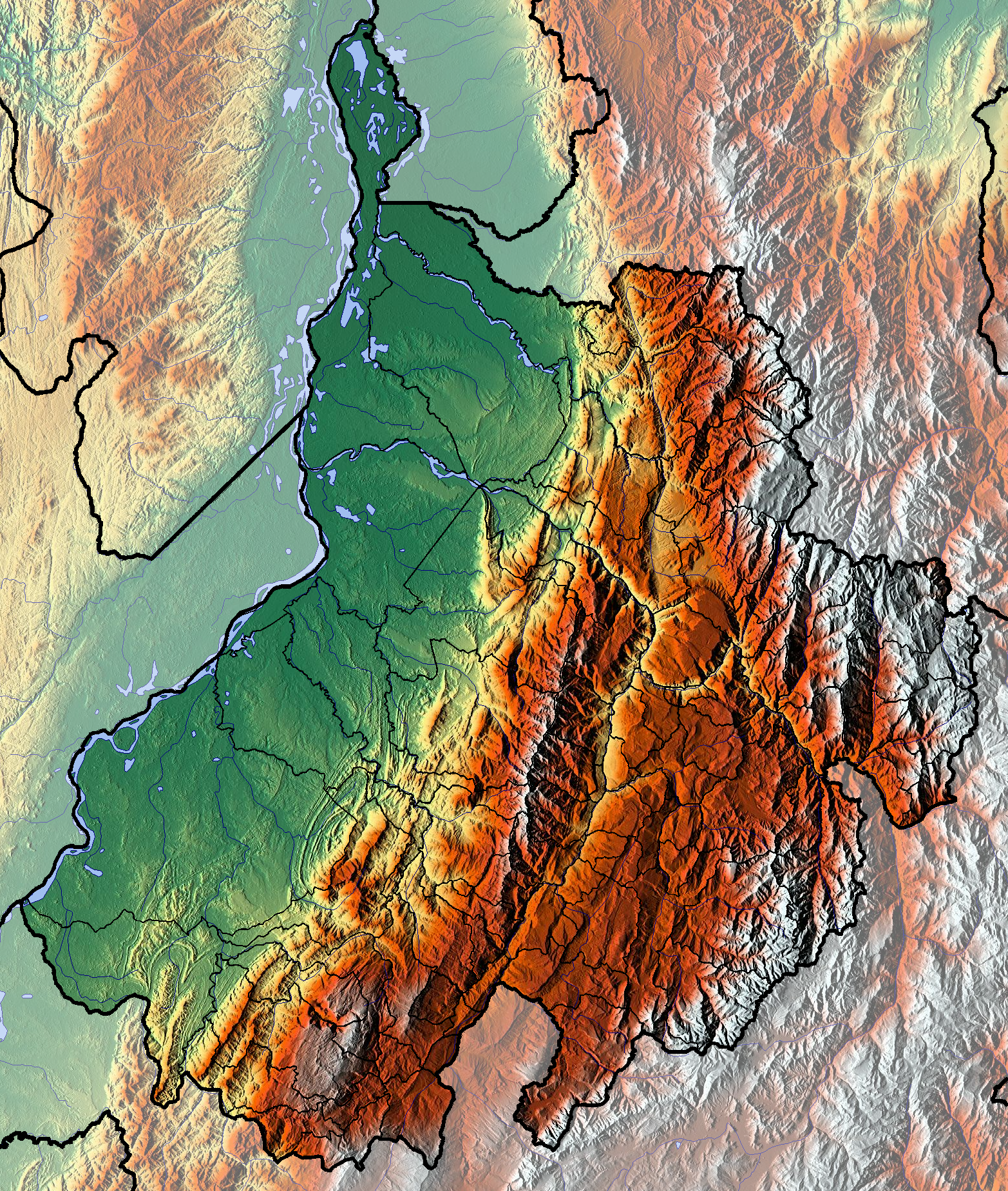
Topography Santander

The harsh expedition through the jungles of Magdalena, La Guajira, Cesar and Santander cost the lives of more than 80% of the troops and they hadn't found El Dorado...

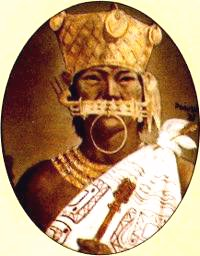
Tisquesusa
(† 1537)

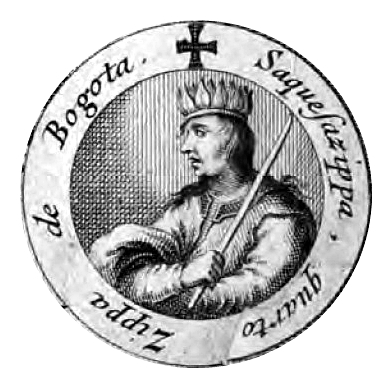
Sagipa
(† 1540)

Sagipa, or Saquesazipa, was the last ruler of Bacatá, as successor of Tisquesusa, defeated near Funza, on 20 April 1537, and died, as the prophecy said, "bathing in his own blood", due to attacks by the Spanish. His body was not found a year after. His defeat meant a new reign over the savanna and the foundation of Bogotá on 6 August 1538

=== Conquest and early colonial period ===
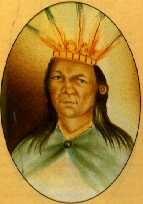
Quemuenchatocha
(† 1537)

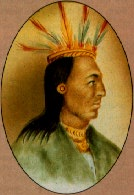
Aquiminzaque
(† 1539)

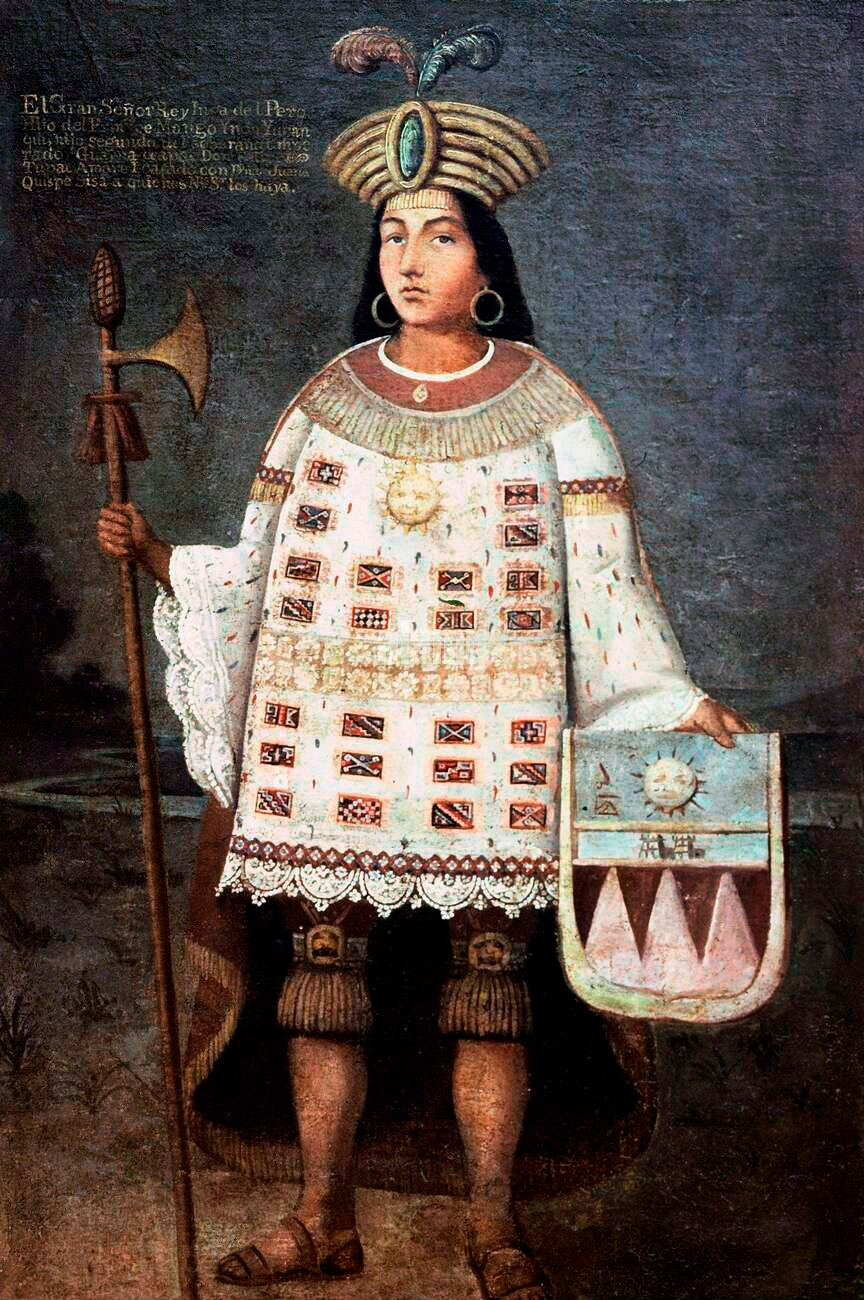
Túpac Amaru
(† 1572)

Aquiminzaque, as successor of Quemuenchatocha, defeated in his home in Hunza, on 20 August 1537, was the last souvereign ruler of the Muisca and was decapitated by the Spanish, as would happen to Túpac Amaru of the Inca, 34 years later

The conquest of the Muisca was the heaviest of all four Spanish expeditions to the great American civilisations. More than 80 percent of the soldiers and horses that started the journey of a year to the northern Muisca Confederation did not survive it. Various settlements were founded by the Spanish between 1537 and 1539.

A delegation of more than 900 men left the tropical city of Santa Marta and went on a harsh expedition through the heartlands of Colombia in search of El Dorado and the civilisation that produced all this precious gold. The leader of the first and main expedition under Spanish flag was Gonzalo Jiménez de Quesada, with his brother Hernán second in command. Several other soldiers were participating in the journey, who would later become encomenderos and taking part in the conquest of other parts of Colombia. Other contemporaneous expeditions into the unknown interior of the Andes, all searching for the mythical land of gold, were starting from later Venezuela, led by Bavarian and other German conquistadors and from the south, starting in the previously founded Kingdom of Quito in later Ecuador.

The first phase of the conquest was ended by the victory of the few conquistadors left over Tisquesusa, the last zipa of Bacatá, who fell and died after the battle at Funza, on the Bogotá savanna, 20 April 1537. The arrival of the Spanish conquerors was revealed to Tisquesusa by the mohan Popón, from the village of Ubaque. He told the Muisca ruler that foreigners were coming and Tisquesusa would die "bathing in his own blood". When Tisquesusa was informed of the advancing invasion of the Spanish soldiers, he sent a spy to Suesca to find out more about their army strength, weapons and with how many warriors they could be beaten. The zipa left the capital Bacatá and took shelter in Nemocón which directed the Spanish troops to there, during this march attacked by more than 600 Muisca warriors.

When Tisquesusa retreated in his fort in Cajicá he allegedly told his men he would not be able to combat against the strong Spanish army in possession of weapons that produced "thunder and lightning". He chose to return to Bacatá and ordered the capital to be evacuated, resulting in an abandoned site when the Spanish arrived. In search for the Muisca ruler the conquistadores went north to find Tisquesusa in the surroundings of Facatativá where they attacked him at night.

Tisquesusa was thrusted by the sword of one of De Quesada's soldiers but without knowing he was the zipa he let him go, after taking the expensive mantle of the ruler. Tisquesusa fled hurt into the mountains and died of his wounds there. His body was only discovered a year later because of the black vultures circling over it.

When Gonzalo Jiménez de Quesada found out the caciques were conspiring against him, he sent out several expeditions of soldiers. His captain Juan de Céspedes went south to found Pasca on 15 July 1537. Hernán was sent north and Gonzalo himself went northeast, to search for the mythical Land of Gold El Dorado. There he did not find golden cities, but emeralds, the Muisca were extracting in Chivor and Somondoco. First foundation was Engativá, presently a locality of Bogotá, on 22 May 1537. Passing through Suba, Chía, Cajicá, Tocancipá, Gachancipá, Guatavita and Sesquilé, he arrived in Chocontá, founding the modern town on 9 June. The journey went eastward into the Tenza Valley through Machetá, Tibiritá, Guateque, Sutatenza and Tenza, founded on San Juan; 24 June. On the same day, Hernán founded Sutatausa. Gonzalo continued northwest through La Capilla and Úmbita. He arrived in Turmequé that he founded on 20 July.

In August 1537 Gonzalo Jiménez de Quesada entered the territories of the zaque, who ruled from Hunza. When the Spanish conquerors entered the outskirts of Hunza and found a hill with poles were bodies were dangling, they named it Cerro de la Horca ("Gallow Hill"). At the time of the conquest Quemuenchatocha was the zaque and he ordered his men to not submit to the European invaders or show them the way to his bohío. He sent messengers to the Spanish conquistadors with valuable peace offers. While this was happening, Quemuenchatocha had hidden his treasures from the Spanish. Hunza was located in a valley not as green as the Bogotá savanna. The advantage of the Spanish weaponry and the use of the horses quickly beat the Muisca warriors.

When Gonzalo arrived at the main bohío of Quemuenchatocha, he found the Muisca ruler sitting in his throne and surrounded by his closest companions. All men were dressed in expensive mantles and adorned with golden crowns. On 20 August 1537, the Spanish beat the zaque and the big and strong Muisca ruler was taken captive to Suesca. There he was tortured and the Spanish soldiers hoped he would reveal where he hid his precious properties. The absence of Quemuenchatocha paved the route for his nephew Aquiminzaque to succeed him as ruler of the northern Muisca, a practice common in Muisca traditions. When Quemuenchatocha was finally released from captivity in Suesca, he fled to Ramiriquí, where he died shortly after. The Spanish soldiers found gold, emeralds, silver, mantles and other valuables in Tunja. They were not able to take all the precious pieces and many were secretly taken away by the Muisca, using folded deer skins. They hid the valuables in nearby hills.

Feb 1537	First contact @ Chipatá
Mar–Apr 1537	Expedition into Muisca Confederation
**20 Apr 1537**	Conquest of **Funza** upon zipa Tisquesusa
May–Aug 1537	Expedition & conquest in Tenza Valley
**20 Aug 1537**	Conquest **Hunza**, zaque Quemuenchatocha
Early Sep 1537	Conquest **Sugamuxi**, iraca Sugamuxi
Oct 1537 – Feb 1538	Other foundations on Altiplano & valleys
**6 Aug 1538**	Foundation **Santafé de Bogotá**, by Gonzalo
**20 Aug 1538**	B. of Tocarema; Spanish & zipa beat Panche
**6 Aug 1539**	Foundation **Tunja**, by Gonzalo Suárez
**15 Dec 1539**	Conquest **Tundama**, by Baltasar Maldonado
Early 1540	Decapitation last zaque **Aquiminzaque**, Hernán

I – Soldiers of the main expedition – Santa Marta-Funza and on – February – 20 April 1537

Name leader in bold	Nationality	Years active	Encountered bold is conquered	Year of death	Image	Notes
**Gonzalo Jiménez** **de Quesada**	Granadian	1536–39; 1569–72	**zipa** **zaque**	1579		
Juan Maldonado	Castilian	1536–39; 1569–72	Muisca			(Note: Not the same as Juan Maldonado, who was only 11 in 1536)
Gonzalo Macías	Castilian	1536–39; 1569–71	Muisca	1571~		
**Hernán Pérez** **de Quesada**	Granadian	1536–39; 1540–42	**Muisca**	1544		
**Gonzalo Suárez Rendón**	Castilian	1536–39	zipa, **zaque**	1590		
Martín Galeano	Castilian	1536–39; 1540–45	Muisca	1554~		
Lázaro Fonte	Castilian	1536–39; 1540–42	Muisca	1542		
Juan de Céspedes	Castilian	1525–43	**Muisca**	1573 or 1576		
Juan de San Martín	Castilian	1536–39; 1540–45	Muisca			
Antonio de Lebrija	Castilian	1536–39	Muisca	1540		
Ortún Velázquez de Velasco	Castilian	1536–39	Muisca	1584		
Bartolomé Camacho Zambrano	Castilian	1536–39	Muisca			
Antonio Díaz de Cardoso	Castilian	1536–39	Muisca			
Pedro Fernández de Valenzuela	Castilian	1536–39	Muisca			
**640+ conquistadors** ~80%	mostly Castilian	April 1536 - April 1537	Diseases, jaguars, crocodiles, climate, **various indigenous warfare**	1536; 1537		

II & III – Soldiers of the expeditions De Belalcázar & Federmann (1535–1539)

Name leader in bold	Nationality	Years active	Encountered bold is conquered	Year of death	Image	Notes
**Sebastián de Belalcázar**	Castilian	1514–39	Muisca	1551		
Baltasar Maldonado	Castilian	1543–52	**Muisca**	1552		
**Nikolaus Federmann**	Bavarian	1535–39	Muisca	1542		
Miguel Holguín y Figueroa	Castilian	1535–39	Muisca	1576>		

I – 1 – Main expedition – inland and up from Chipatá to Funza – March – April 1537

Settlement bold is founded	Department	Date	Year	Altitude (m) urban centre	Notes	Map
**Chipatá**	Santander	8 March	1537	1820		
Barbosa	Santander	March	1537	1610		
**Moniquirá**	Boyacá	March	1537	1669	(Note: Note: date of foundation says 16 March 1537, which cannot be correct, as the troops were already in Cundinamarca by that date)	
Santa Sofía	Boyacá	March	1537	2387		
Sutamarchán	Boyacá	March	1537	1800		
Ráquira	Boyacá	March	1537	2150		
Simijaca	Cundinamarca	March	1537	2559		
Susa	Cundinamarca	March	1537	2655		
Fúquene	Cundinamarca	March	1537	2750		
**Guachetá**	Cundinamarca	12 March	1537	2688		
**Lenguazaque**	Cundinamarca	13 March	1537	2589		
Cucunubá	Cundinamarca	13–14 March	1537	2590		
**Suesca**	Cundinamarca	14 March	1537	2584		
Nemocón	Cundinamarca	March	1537	2585		
Zipaquirá	Cundinamarca	March	1537	2650		
**Cajicá**	Cundinamarca	23 March	1537	2558		
**Chía**	Cundinamarca	24 March	1537	2564		
Cota	Cundinamarca	March–April	1537	2566		
**Funza**	Cundinamarca	20 April	1537	2548		

I – 2 – Gonzalo – Tenza Valley – Conquest of Hunza & Sugamuxi – May – 20 August & September 1537

Settlement bold is founded	Department	Date	Year	Note(s)	Map
**Engativá**	Cundinamarca	22 May	1537		
Suba	Cundinamarca	May	1537		
Chía	Cundinamarca	May	1537		
Cajicá	Cundinamarca	May	1537		
Tocancipá	Cundinamarca	May–June	1537		
Gachancipá	Cundinamarca	May–June	1537		
Guatavita	Cundinamarca	May–June	1537		
Sesquilé; Lake Guatavita; El Dorado	Cundinamarca	May–June	1537		
**Chocontá**	Cundinamarca	9 June	1537		
Machetá	Cundinamarca	June	1537		
Tibiritá	Cundinamarca	June	1537		
Guateque	Boyacá	June	1537		
Sutatenza	Boyacá	June	1537		
**Tenza**	Boyacá	24 June	1537		
La Capilla	Boyacá	June–July	1537		
Chivor	Boyacá	July	1537		
Úmbita	Boyacá	July	1537		
**Turmequé**	Boyacá	20 July	1537		
**Boyacá**	Boyacá	8 August	1537		
Ciénega	Boyacá	August	1537		
Soracá	Boyacá	20 August ~15:00	1537		
Hunza	Boyacá	20 August	1537		

3 – Hernán – Foundation of Sutatausa – 24 June 1537

Name	Department	Date	Year	Note(s)	Map
**Sutatausa**	Cundinamarca	24 June	1537		

4 – Juan de Céspedes – Southern savanna – 1537

Name	Department	Date	Year	Note(s)	Map
**Pasca**	Cundinamarca	15 July	1537		
San Antonio del Tequendama	Cundinamarca		1539		

5 – Juan de San Martín – 1537–1550

Name	Department	Date	Year	Note(s)	Map
El Colegio	Cundinamarca		1537		
**Cuítiva**	Boyacá	19 January	1550		

6 – Gonzalo et al. – Foundations of Bogotá and savanna

Name	Department	Date	Year	Note(s)	Map
**Bojacá**	Cundinamarca	16 October	1537		
**Somondoco**	Boyacá	1 November	1537		
Une	Cundinamarca	23 February	1538		

7 – Gonzalo Suárez Rendón – Foundation of Tunja – 6 August 1539

Name	Department	Date	Year	Note(s)	Map
**Tunja**	Boyacá	6 August	1539		

8 – Baltasar Maldonado – Conquest of Tundama – December 1539

Name	Department	Date	Year	Note(s)	Map
Duitama	Boyacá	15 December	1539		

9 – Hernán & Lázaro Fonte a.o. – 1540

Name	Department	Date	Year	Note(s)	Map
Motavita	Boyacá		1540		
Nevado del Sumapaz	Cundinamarca		1540		

== Early colonial period ==
Year(s)	Epidemic
1537	Tunja Province: ~250,000 est. inh.
1558<	no data
1558–60	smallpox, measles
1568–69	influenza
1587–90	influenza (or typhus)
1607	smallpox
1617–18	measles (after food shortages)
1621	smallpox
1633	typhus
1636	Tunja Province: ~50,000 est. inh. -80%

Not only the Spanish settlers had lost large percentages of their men due to warfare and diseases. The assessed corregimientos of the province of Tunja between 1537 and 1636 shows a decline of the total Muisca population between 65 and 85%. Epidemics were the main cause of the rapid reduction in population. Various have been reported and many undescribed in the first twenty years of contact.

After the foundation of Bogotá and the installation of the new dependency of the Spanish Crown, several strategies were important to the Spanish conquerors. The rich mineral resources of the Altiplano had to be extracted, the agriculture was quickly reformed, a system of encomiendas was installed and a main concern of the Spanish was the evangelisation of the Muisca. On 9 October 1549, Carlos V sent a royal letter to the New Kingdom directed at the priests about the necessity of population reduction of the Muisca. The indigenous people were working in the encomiendas which limited their religious conversion. To speed up the process of submittance to the Spanish reign, the mobility of the indigenous people was prohibited and the people gathered in resguardos. The formerly celebrated festivities in their religion disappeared. Specific times for the catechesis were controlled by laws, as executed in royal dictates in 1537, 1538 and 1551. The first bishop of Santafé, Juan de los Barrios, ordered to destroy the temples of the Muisca and replace them with Catholic churches. The last public religious ceremony of the Muisca religion was held in Ubaque on 27 December 1563. The second bishop of Santafé, Luis Zapata de Cárdenas, intensified the aggressive policies against the Muisca religion and the burnings of their sacred sites. This formed the final nail in the coffin of the former polytheistic society.

The transition to a mixed agriculture with Old World crops was remarkably fast, mainly to do with the fertility of the lands of the Altiplano permitting European crops to grow there, while in the more tropical areas the soil was not so much suited for the foreign crops. In 1555, the Muisca of Toca were growing European crops as wheat and barley and sugarcane was grown in other areas. The previously self-sustaining economy was quickly transformed into one based on intensive agriculture and mining that produced changes in the landscape and culture of the Muisca.

== See also ==
- Maya civilization
- Sitio Sierra
- Spanish conquest of the Muisca, Muisca art

- Muisca economy, people
- Muisca architecture, astronomy, mummies, warfare, women

- Aztec Empire
- Inca Empire
- Muisca
- Tunjo

== Bibliography and further reading ==
- Acosta, Joaquín (1848), Compendio histórico del descubrimiento y colonización de la Nueva Granada en el siglo décimo sexto [Historical overview of discovery and colonization of New Granada in the sixteenth century], Paris: Beau Press, pp. 1–460, OCLC 23030434
- Francis, John Michael (2002), "Población, enfermedad y cambio demográfico, 1537–1636. Demografía histórica de Tunja: Una mirada crítica", Fronteras de la Historia, 7, ICANH: 13–76, doi:10.22380/20274688.682
- Francis, John Michael (1993), "Muchas hipas, no minas" The Muiscas, a merchant society: Spanish misconceptions and demographic change (M.A.) (M.A.), University of Alberta, pp. 1–118
- Gamboa Mendoza, Jorge (2016), Los muiscas, grupos indígenas del Nuevo Reino de Granada. Una nueva propuesta sobre su organizacíon socio-política y su evolucíon en el siglo XVI – The Muisca, indigenous groups of the New Kingdom of Granada. A new proposal on their social-political organization and their evolution in the 16th century (video) (in Spanish), Museo del Oro
- Gamboa Mendoza, Jorge (2003), "El papel de la minería en la formación de la economía y la sociedad colonial del Nuevo Reino de Granada, siglos XVI-XVIII – The role of mining in the formation of the economy and colonial society of the New Kingdom of Granada, 16th–18th centuries" (PDF), Takwá (in Spanish): 1–24
- Groot de Mahecha, Ana María (2014) [2008], Sal y poder en el altiplano de Bogotá, 1537–1640 (in Spanish), Universidad Nacional de Colombia, pp. 1–174, ISBN 978-958-719-046-5
- Groot de Mahecha, Ana María (1992), Checua: Una secuencia cultural entre 8500 y 3000 años antes del presente - Checua: a cultural sequence between 8500 and 3000 years before present, Banco de la República, pp. 1–95
- Henderson, Hope; Ostler, Nicholas (2005), "Muisca settlement organization and chiefly authority at Suta, Valle de Leyva, Colombia: A critical appraisal of native concepts of house for studies of complex societies", Journal of Anthropological Archaeology, 24 (2), Elsevier: 148–178, doi:10.1016/j.jaa.2005.01.002, ISSN 0278-4165
- Izquierdo Peña, Manuel Arturo (2014), Calendario Muisca – Muisca calendar (video) (in Spanish)
- Izquierdo Peña, Manuel Arturo (2009), The Muisca Calendar: An approximation to the timekeeping system of the ancient native people of the northeastern Andes of Colombia (PhD), Université de Montréal, pp. 1–170, arXiv:0812.0574
- Kruschek, Michael H. (2003), The evolution of the Bogotá chiefdom: A household view (PhD) (PDF) (PhD), University of Pittsburgh, pp. 1–271
- Langebaek Rueda, Carl Henrik (2005a), "La élite no siempre piensa lo mismo – The elite does not always think the same", Muiscas: representaciones, cartografías y etnopolíticas de la memoria (in Spanish), Universidad La Javeriana, pp. 180–199, ISBN 958-683-643-6
- Langebaek Rueda, Carl Henrik (2005b), "Fiestas y caciques muiscas en el Infiernito, Colombia: un análisis de la relación entre festejos y organización política - Festivities and Muisca caciques in El Infiernito, Colombia: an analysis of the relation between celebrations and political organisation", Boletín de Arqueología (in Spanish), 9, PUCP: 281–295, ISSN 1029-2004
- Martínez Martín, A. F.; Manrique Corredor, E. J. (2014), "Alimentación prehispánica y transformaciones tras la conquista europea del altiplano cundiboyacense, Colombia" [Pre-Columbian Food and Transformations after European Conquest of Cundiboyacense High Plateau, Colombia], Revista Virtual Universidad Católica del Norte (in Spanish), 41, Universidad Católica del Norte: 96–111, ISSN 0124-5821
- Ocampo López, Javier (2013), Mitos y leyendas indígenas de Colombia – Indigenous myths and legends of Colombia (in Spanish), Bogotá, Colombia: Plaza & Janes Editores Colombia S.A., ISBN 978-958-14-1416-1
- Ocampo López, Javier (2007), Grandes culturas indígenas de América - Great indigenous cultures of the Americas (in Spanish), Bogotá, Colombia: Plaza & Janes Editores Colombia S.A., pp. 1–238, ISBN 978-958-14-0368-4
- Paepe, Paul de; Cardale de Schrimpff, Marianne (1990), "Resultados de un estodio petrológico de cerámicas del Periodo Herrera provenientes de la Sabana de Bogotá y sus implicaciones arqueológicas – Results of a petrological study of ceramics form the Herrera Period coming from the Bogotá savanna and its archaeological implications", Boletín Museo del Oro (in Spanish), Museo del Oro: 99–119
- Cardale de Schrimpff, Marianne (1985), En busca de los primeros agricultores del Altiplano Cundiboyacense – Searching for the first farmers of the Altiplano Cundiboyacense (PDF) (in Spanish), Bogotá, Colombia: Banco de la República, pp. 99–125
- Trimborn, Hermann (2005), "La organización del poder público en las culturas soberanas de los chibchas – The public power organisation in the common cultures of the Chibchas", Muiscas: representaciones, cartografías y etnopolíticas de la memoria (in Spanish), Universidad La Javeriana, pp. 298–314, ISBN 958-683-643-6
- Zerda, Liborio (1947) [1883], El Dorado (PDF) (in Spanish)

=== Spanish chroniclers ===
- "Epítome de la conquista del Nuevo Reino de Granada", Boletín Cultural y Bibliográfico, 16 (3), Banco de la República: 81–97, 1979 [1889 (1539/1548-1559?)]
- Jiménez de Quesada, Gonzalo (1576), Memoria de los descubridores, que entraron conmigo a descubrir y conquistar el Reino de Granada (in Spanish)
- De Castellanos, Juan (1857) [1589], Elegías de varones ilustres de Indias (in Spanish), pp. 1–567
- De Lugo, Bernardo (1619), Gramática en la lengua general del Nuevo Reyno, llamada mosca – Grammar in the general language of the New Kingdom, called Mosca (Muisca) (in Spanish), Madrid, Spain, pp. 1–162
- Simón, Pedro (1892) [1626], Noticias historiales de las conquistas de Tierra Firme en las Indias occidentales (1882–92) vol.1–5 (in Spanish)
- Rodríguez Freyle, Juan; Achury Valenzuela, Darío (1979) [1859 (1638)], El Carnero – Conquista i descubrimiento del nuevo reino de Granada de las Indias Occidentales del mar oceano, i fundacion de la ciudad de Santa Fe de Bogota (PDF) (in Spanish), Fundacion Biblioteca Ayacuch, pp. 1–598
- Fernández de Piedrahita, Lucas (1688), Historia general de las conquistas del Nuevo Reino de Granada (in Spanish)
