= Boyacá, Boyacá =

Coordinates: 5°27′15″N 73°21′43″W

Boyacá
- Municipality and town
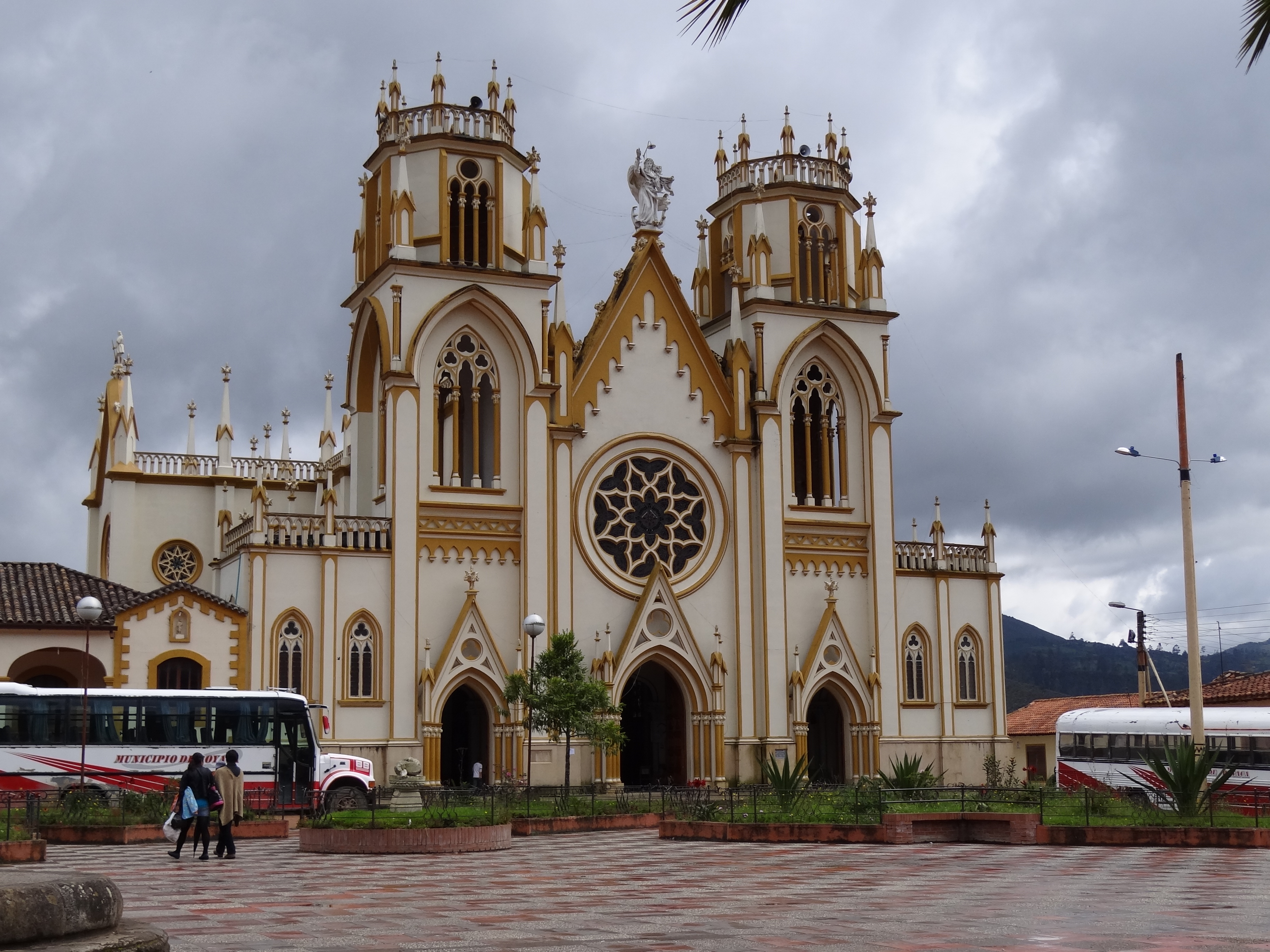
- Church of Boyacá

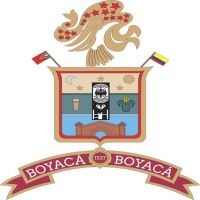
- Flag Coat of arms

- Location of the municipality and town of Boyacá in the Boyacá department of Colombia
- Country: Colombia
- Department: Boyacá Department
- Province: Márquez Province
- Founded: 8 August 1537
- Founder: Gonzalo Jiménez de Quesada

Government
  - Mayor: Rafael Antonio Rátiva Díaz (2020-2023)

Area
  - Municipality and town: 48 km^{2} (19 sq mi)
- Elevation: 2,420 m (7,940 ft)

Population (2015)
  - Municipality and town: 4,472
  - Density: 93/km^{2} (240/sq mi)
  - Urban: 403
- Time zone: UTC-5 (Colombia Standard Time)
- Website: Official website

Boyacá is a town and municipality in the Márquez Province, part of the department of Boyacá, Colombia. It is located approximately 15 kilometres (9.3 mi) from the city of Tunja, the capital of the department. Boyacá limits Tunja and Soracá in the north, Jenesano in the south, Nuevo Colón and Ramiriquí in the west and Ventaquemada in the east.

== Etymology ==
The name of both the municipality and the department, Boyacá, comes from Chibcha and means "Region of the blankets" or "Enclosure of the cacique".

== History ==
Boyacá in the times before the Spanish conquest was ruled by the zaque of nearby Hunza, the ruler of the Muisca, who were organised in their loose Muisca Confederation.

Modern Boyacá was founded on August 8, 1537, by Spanish conquistador Gonzalo Jiménez de Quesada who was searching for the mythical El Dorado.

== Gallery ==
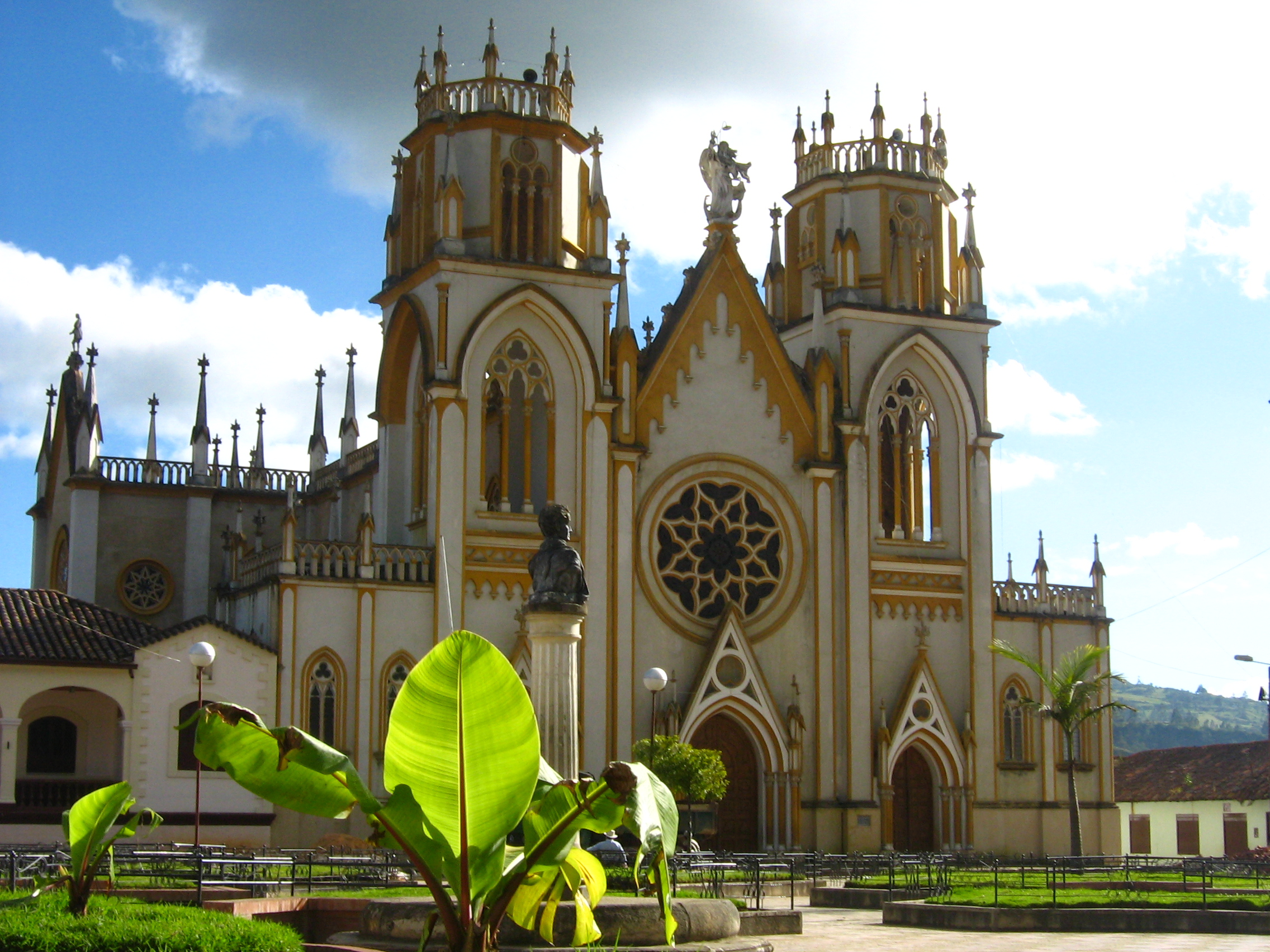
Church of Boyacá

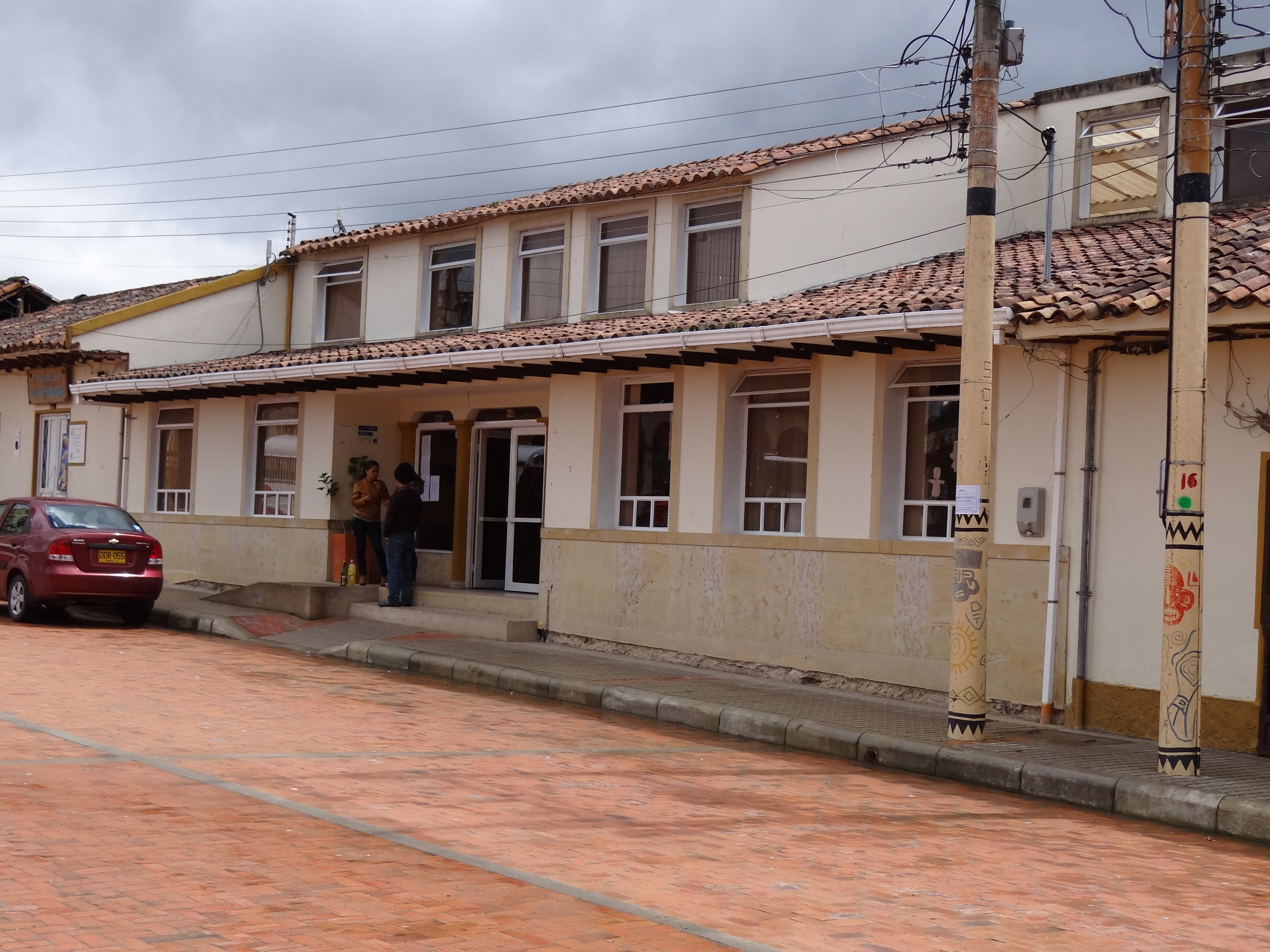
Council building

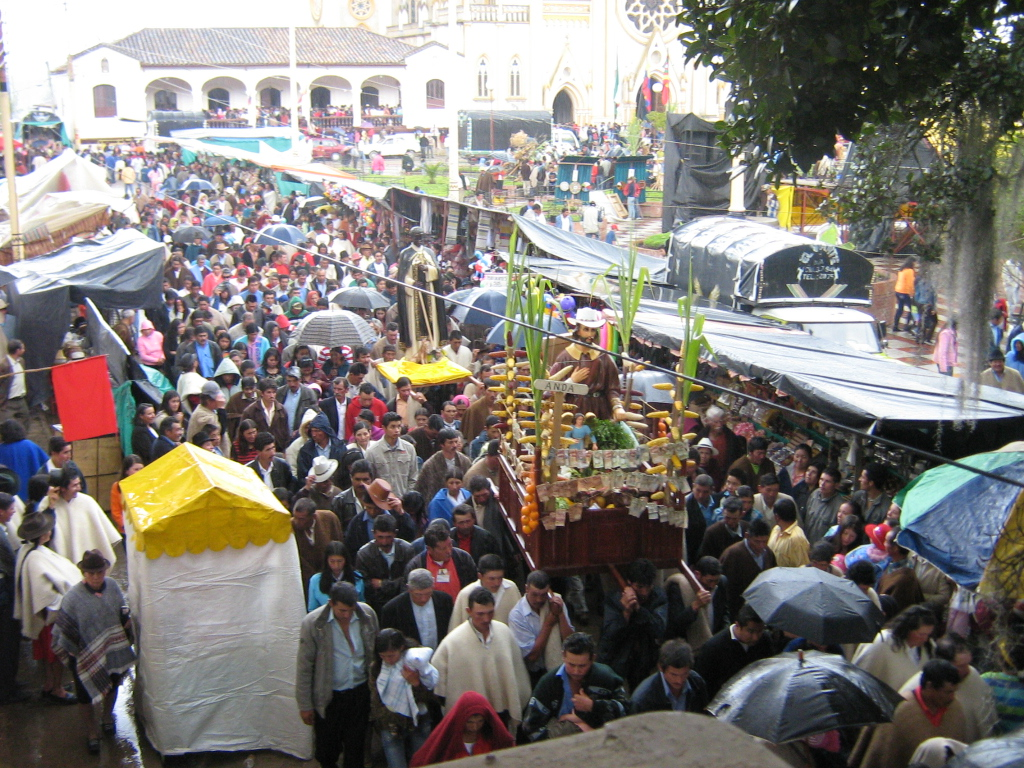
San Isidro Festival

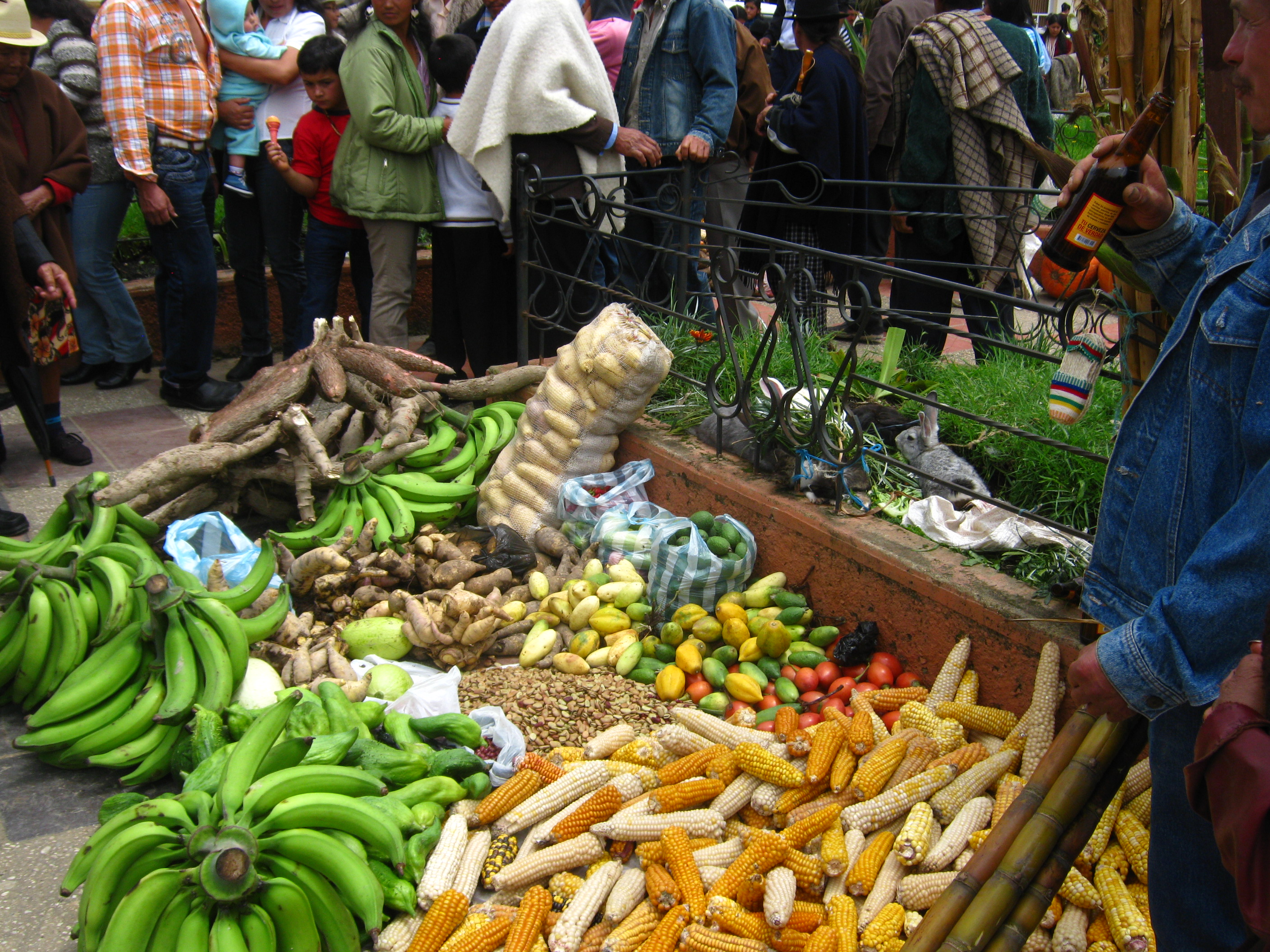
Local produce at the San Isidro Festival

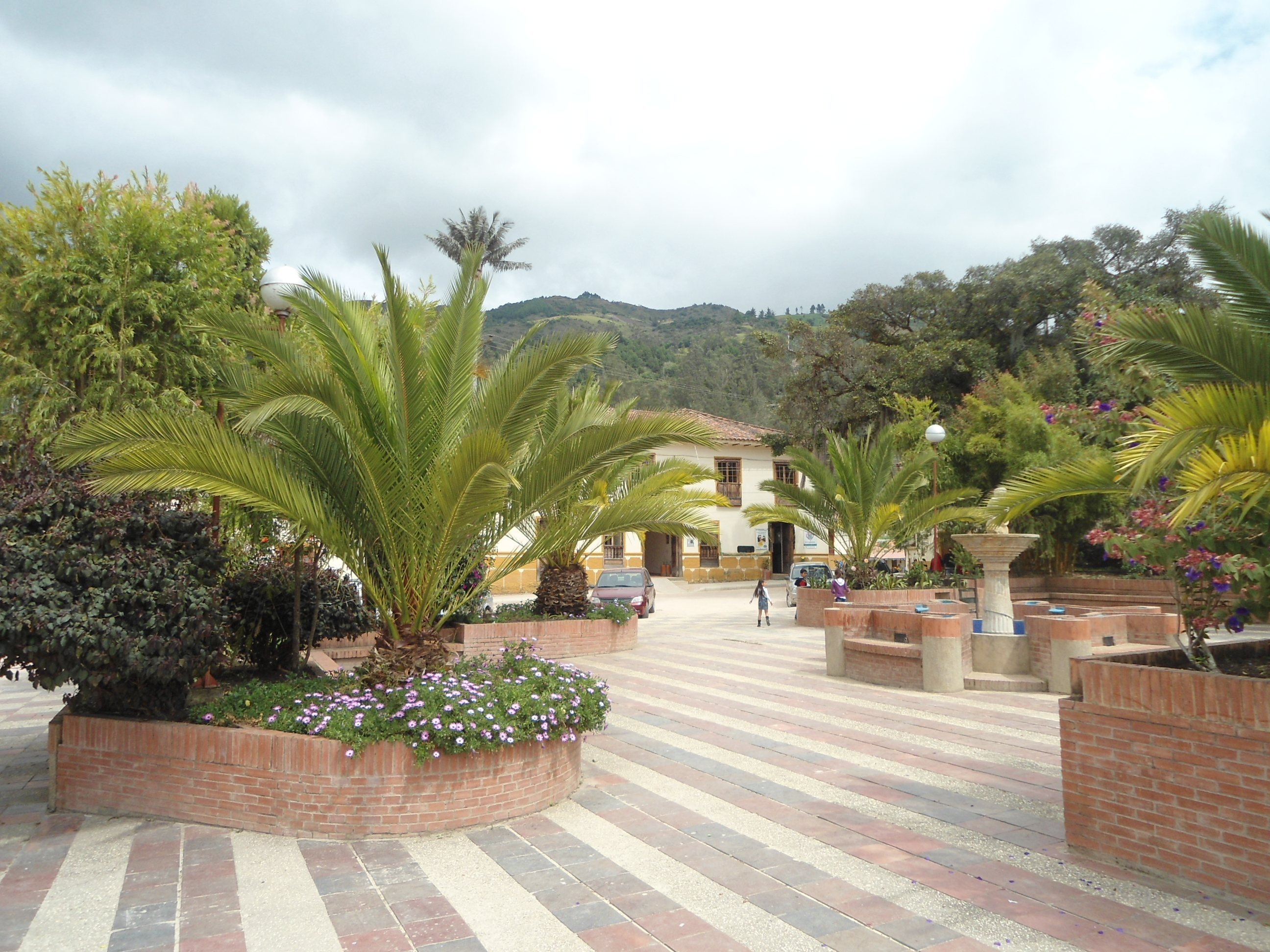
Principal Park

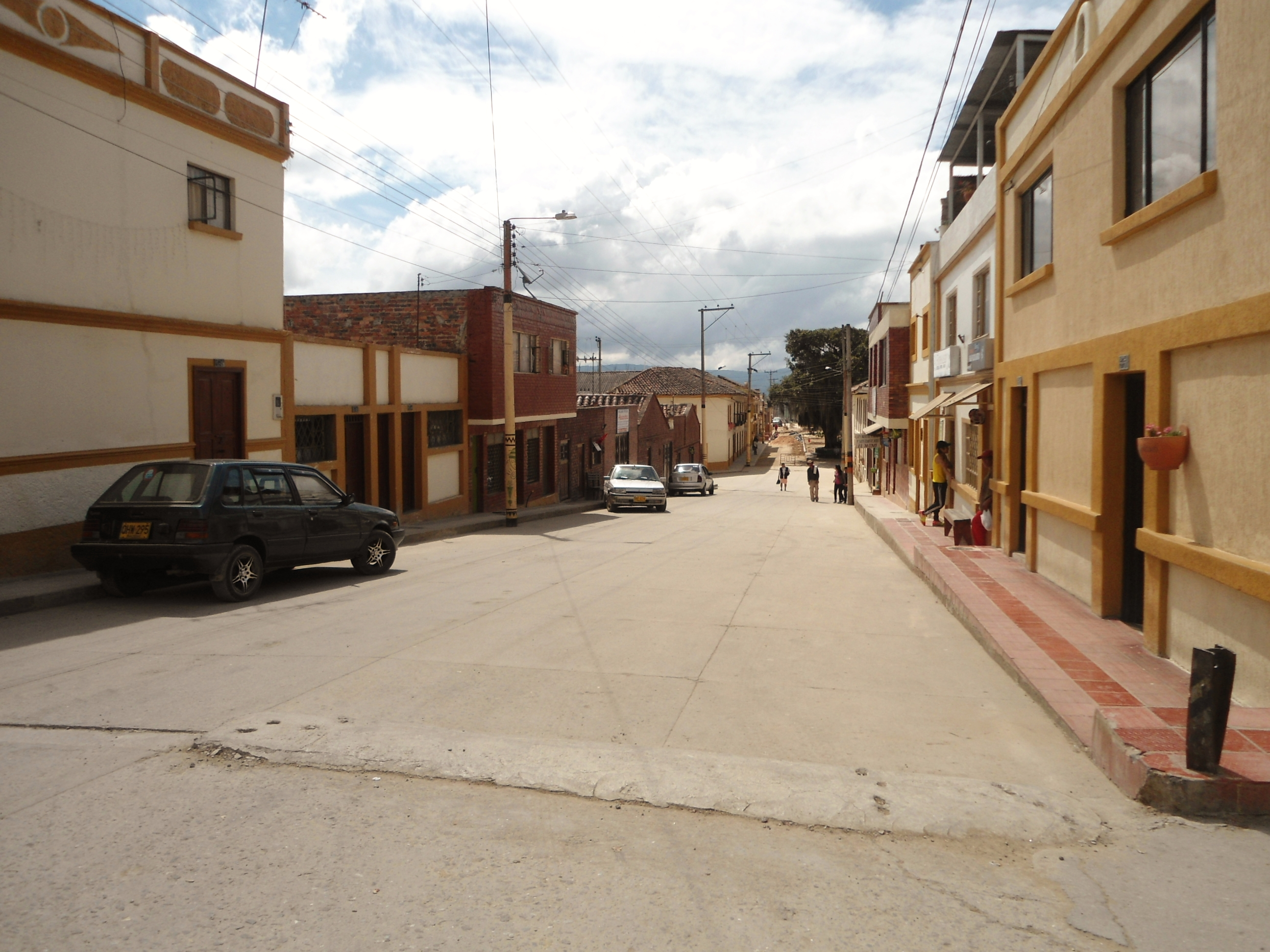
Streets of Boyacá (Boyacá)

== Bibliography ==
- Senado de la República de Colombia (1989), Municipios colombianos. Bogotá: Pama Editores Ltda. ISBN 958-9077-02-1
