= Meicuchuca =

- Zipa of Bacatá
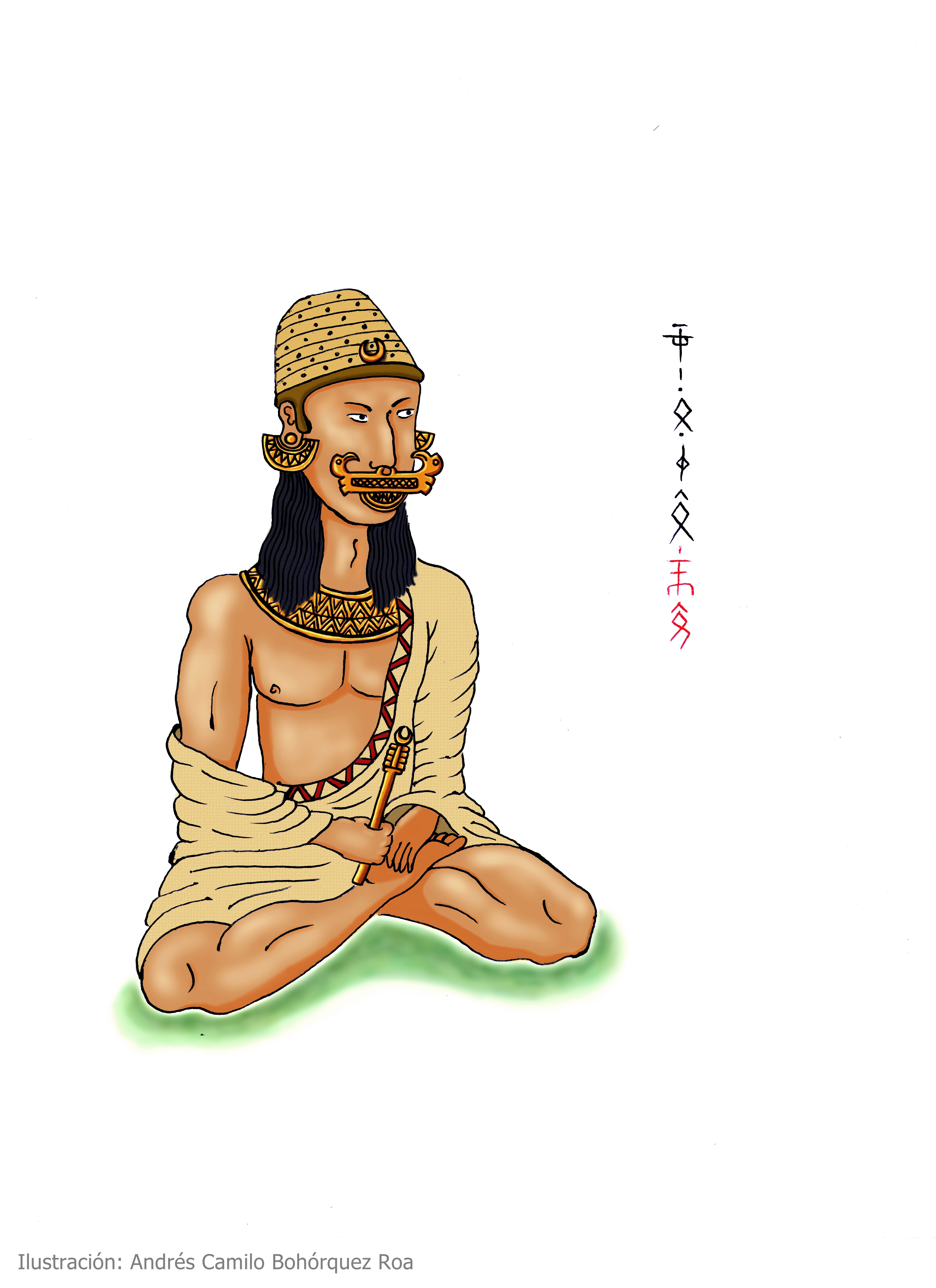
- portrait of Meicuchuca, by: Andrés Camilo Bohórquez Roa

Zipa of Bacatá
- Reign: c. 1450 – 1470
- Predecessor: Menquetá
- Successor: Saguamanchica
- Nephew: Saguamanchica
- Born: unknown Bacatá, Muisca Confederation
- Died: c. 1470; Bacatá, Muisca Confederation
- House: Bacatá
- Religion: Muisca religion

Meicuchuca (died 1470) was the first ruler (zipa) of Bacatá, as of around 1450. His zaque counterpart ruling over the northern area of the Muisca territory was Hunzahúa.

== Biography ==
Little is known about Meicuchuca and many stories about his reign are more mythical than historical. He ruled the southern Muisca territory from around 1450 to 1470 and was succeeded according to Muisca heritage laws by his nephew Saguamanchica.

=== Meicuchuca and the snake ===
The legend of Meicuchuca and the snake tells the story of the zipa who already had many wives. Polygamy was common practice with the Muisca and the higher the rank, the more wives could be held. The highest position of zipa could allow to have and sustain 300 wives, while the lower rank cacique "only" made 100 wives possible.

Meicuchuca allegedly fell in love with a woman outside of the Muisca community. He only had eye for her and spent day and night with the beautiful stranger, forgetting all his other wives.

His primary wife (Chibcha: gui chyty) became very jealous and sought the help of a Muisca priest; chyquy. He recommended her to fast and not bathe herself for twelve days. The first wife did what the priest had told her but the lack of food brought her close to death. The priest offered golden figures to the gods and ordered the wife to take a bath, put on new clothes and head to the bed of her husband. She was surprised to find Meicuchuca sleeping in the bed and next to him an enormous snake.

The primary wife returned to the priest and told him what happened. The priest ordered the wife next day to take a bath in the Bogotá River close to the Tequendama Falls with the lover of Meicuchuca and other women of Bacatá. The women went bathing in the river and suddenly the lover of Meicuchuca transformed in a snake again and disappeared in the water. Meicuchuca, terrified by the snake transformation, found the love for his wives again.

=== Meicuchuca in Muisca history ===
History of the Muisca
Altiplano	Muisca	Art	Architecture	Astronomy	Cuisine	El Dorado	Subsistence	Women	Conquest

== See also ==
- Muisca rulers, history of Bogotá
