= Jorge Gamboa Mendoza =

Colombian anthropologist and historian (born 1970)

- Born: January 27, 1970 (age 56); Pamplona, Norte de Santander, Colombia
- Education: Universidad Nacional de Colombia
- Known for: Anthropology, Colombian history
- Scientific career
- Fields: History, anthropology
- Workplaces: Instituto Colombiano de Antropología e Historia (ICANH)
- Thesis: El Significado de la dote dentro de las prácticas matrimoniales de la sociedad colonial: El caso de la Provincia de Pamplona de la Nueva Granada a finales del siglo XVI (2002)

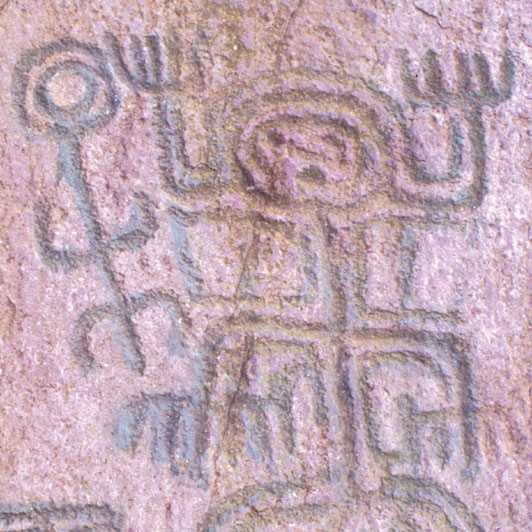
The site of El Abra, dated at 12,400 years BP, one of the oldest human evidences in South America

Jorge Augusto Gamboa Mendoza (born 27 January 1970) is a Colombian anthropologist and historian. He has been contributing on the knowledge of Hispanic and pre-Hispanic territories of what is now Colombia, especially the Muisca. Jorge Gamboa speaks Spanish and French.

== Biography ==
Jorge Gamboa Mendoza was born in Pamplona in the northern department of Norte de Santander. He studied anthropology as an undergraduate at the Universidad Nacional de Colombia in Bogotá from 1986 to 1991 and history from 1993 to 2002 at the same university, graduating with a thesis called El Significado de la dote dentro de las prácticas matrimoniales de la sociedad colonial: El caso de la Provincia de Pamplona de la Nueva Granada a finales del siglo XVI ("The significance of the dowry within the matrimonial practices of the colonial society: The case of the Pamplona Province of the New Kingdom of Granada at the end of the 16th century").

Since 2001 Jorge Gamboa Mendoza is a researcher at the Instituto Colombiano de Antropología e Historia (ICANH) in Bogotá.

== Works ==
This list is a selection.

=== Books ===
- 2016. Los muiscas y su incorporación a la monarquía castellana en el siglo XVI: Nuevas lecturas desde la Nueva Historia de la Conquista. Tunja: Universidad Pedagógica y Tecnológica de Colombia.
- 2010 - Fray Bernardo de Lugo. Gramática en la lengua general del Nuevo Reino, llamada Mosca [1619]
- 2010 - El cacicazgo muisca en los años posteriores a la Conquista : del sihipkua al cacique colonial, 1537-1575. Bogotá: Instituto Colombiano de Antropología e Historia.
- 2010 - La dote matrimonial a finales del siglo XVI : el caso de la provincia de Pamplon aen el Nuevo Reino de Granada, 1574-1630
- 2003 - El precio de un marido. El significado de la dote matrimonial en el Nuevo Reino de Granada. Pamplona (1570-1650)
- 2002 - Encomienda, identidad y poder. Los encomenderos y conquistadores del Nuevo Reino de Granada vistos a través de las probanzas de méritos y servicios (1550-1650)

=== Articles ===
- 2006 - Caciques, encomenderos y santuarios en el Nuevo Reino de Granada: reflexiones metodológicas sobre la ficción en los archivos: el caso del cacique de Tota, 1574-1575
- 2004 - La encomienda y las sociedades indígenas del Nuevo Reino de Granada: el caso de la provincia de Pamplona (1549-1650)
- 1998 - El régimen de la encomienda en una zona minera de la Nueva Granada, 1549 - 1620
- 1997 - La dote matrimonial a finales del siglo XVI. El caso de la Provincia de Pamplona en el Nuevo Reino de Granada, 1574-1630
- 1993 - Cabildo y Elites Locales en la Sociedad Colonial: Encomenderos, mineros y comerciantes en la Provincia de Pamplona (1600-1660)

== See also ==
- List of Muisca scholars
- Spanish conquest of the Muisca
- Muisca

== Notable works by Gamboa Mendoza ==
- Gamboa Mendoza, Jorge (2016), Los muiscas, grupos indígenas del Nuevo Reino de Granada. Una nueva propuesta sobre su organizacíon socio-política y su evolucíon en el siglo XVI - The Muisca, indigenous groups of the New Kingdom of Granada. A new proposal on their social-political organization and their evolution in the 16th century (video) (in Spanish), Museo del Oro
- Gamboa Mendoza, Jorge (2010), Gramática en la Lengua General Del Nuevo Reino, Llamada Mosca - Grammar in the general language of the New Kingdom, called Mosca (Muisca) (in Spanish), Bogotá, Colombia: Instituto Colombiano de Antropología e Historia, pp. 1–191, ISBN 978-9588181653
- Gamboa Mendoza, Jorge (2008), Los Muiscas en los siglos XVI y XVII: miradas desde la arqueología, la antropología y la historia - The Muisca in the 16th and 17th centuries: views from the archaeology, the anthropology and the history (in Spanish), Universidad de Los Andes, pp. 1–318
- Gamboa Mendoza, Jorge (2006), Los caciques en la legislación indiana: una reflexión sobre la condición jurídica de las autoridades indígenas en el siglo XVI - The caciques in the indian legislation: a review about the juridical condition of the indigenous authorities in the 16th century (PDF) (in Spanish), pp. 1–38
- Gamboa Mendoza, Jorge (2004), "La encomienda y las sociedades indígenas del Nuevo Reino de Granada: el caso de la provincia de Pamplona (1549-1650) - The encomienda and the indigenous societies in the New Kingdom of Granada: the case of the Pamplona Province (1549-1650)" (PDF), Revista de Indias (in Spanish), LXIV (232): 749–770, doi:10.3989/revindias.2004.i232.433, ISSN 0034-8341
- Gamboa Mendoza, Jorge (2003), "El papel de la minería en la formación de la economía y la sociedad colonial del Nuevo Reino de Granada, siglos XVI-XVIII - The role of mining in the formation of the economy and colonial society of the New Kingdom of Granada, 16th-18th centuries" (PDF), Takwá (in Spanish): 1–24
