= Sitio Sierra =

Archaeological site

Sitio Sierra is an archaeological site located in the Herrera Province of Parita Bay in Panama. It lies in the south-central portion of the country, twelve kilometers from where the Santa Maria River meets the Pacific Ocean. Archaeologists have asserted that it was a nucleated agricultural village presumed to have thrived during the Late Occupation Sequence until the Spanish conquest. It was probably an egalitarian society along with other sites from the same region and time period (such as Cerro Mangote). It contains domestic features including cemeteries, middens, and ancient houses. The area includes two main periods portrayed by more recent settlement areas that are stratified above an earlier cemetery. Systematic pedestrian surveys published in an article by Richard E. Cooke in 1979 hypothesize that the original ancient habitat might have covered at least 45 hectares (Hallar, 2004).

== Artifacts ==
Sitio Sierra contains some gold artifacts that are considered some of the oldest of the region. The gold pieces have been described as probably being cut from molded flat sheets, and then spiraled into ornaments. Spondylus (shellfish) found at the site are considered especially important because of the nutritional benefits that they probably provided for the inhabitants. Evidence in the middens and around the site also suggest the transformation of shells into tools and goods. A large amount of red beads made from the shells are found throughout the site according to a study done by Sanchez and Herrera in 1995. Sitio Sierra is the only site in Panama that contains prismatic blade production while lacking any access to chert projections. This causes scientists to infer a system of trade with other local cities that have produced evidence for these resources. Based on chipped rocks found in association with other stone tools in the area, archaeologists hypothesize that these people probably were accustomed to sharpening and re-sharpening axes, but no artifacts have been found in association with axe manufacturing. This was hypothesized by Richard Cooke in 1979. His articles also support the possibility of stone-tool trade between ancient Panamanian cities.

There have been extensive excavations under an elliptical structure that was probably a house. Scientists have revealed a cemetery that consists of 25 individuals along with other items such as stingray spines, fool’s gold (pyrite), axes, and pottery from the La Mula phase (AD 250). Archaeologists have speculated whether there are any religious or ideological connections with the goods found among the bodies. Various inconsistencies of these items occur between this site and other local sites according to research done by Mikael Haller in 2004. Some scientists suggest that the hoard of goods represent differences in social ranks, while others suggest that the goods might be indicators of occupation or sex rather than rank.

== Diet ==
The faunal fossils found in the area belong mostly to estuarine fish supporting marine diet concentrations approaching as high as 73%. The presence of non-estuarine fossil evidence supports the claim that the Paleo-Indian peoples tapped into their fresh-water resources for food in addition to marine selections from Parita Bay. Non-estuarine remains have been calculated to account for as much as 11% of the diet. In addition, fossil evidence for over 400 species of birds and other animals include the orange-chinned parakeet (Brotogeris jugularis), crested bobwhite (Colinus cristatus), possible mangrove cuckoo (Coccyzus minor), groove-billed ani (Crotophaga sulcirostris), great-tailed grackle (Cassidix mexicanus), giant toad (Bufo marinus), a lizard (Ameiva ameiva), Green Iguana (Iguana iguana), mud turtle (Kinosternon spp.), painted terrapin (Chrysemys scripta), several species of shark (superorder Selachimorpha), estuarine fishes, non-estuarine marine fishes, freshwater fish, mangrove and mudflat mollusks, and mudflat crabs (Haller 2004).

In addition to the consumption of fish and terrestrial animals, most of the macrobotanical remains are from maize. Maize was probably the most important and steady source of botanical food in the area. After extensive bone analysis, archaeologists have hypothesized that by the time Sitio Sierra was occupied by larger populations in the 1st and 2nd centuries AD, maize had become a dominant source of nutrition compared to other ancient Panamanian cities that flourished at the same time such as Cerro Mangote.

== Additional questions and hypothesis ==
Sitio Sierra is thought by archaeologists to have been a nice location for settlement because of its multiple natural resources for fishing, and its well vegetated surroundings that supported habitats for terrestrial animals plants. Its relatively large population of around 1,000–2,000 occupants would have made it one of the most densely populated areas in the region at that time. One small, oval-shaped foundation found on the site contains some rather novel and innovative amenities including roofing made from palm, and ovens made from clay and rocks. There is strong evidence for deforestation occurring in the area approximately during the 1st century. Since marine sources account for the largest food resource for Sitio Sierra, scientists ponder how these fish would be transferred over 12 kilometers along the Santa Maria River without rotting. One claim is that these people must have had some knowledge of food preservation, and the use of salt as a preservative. Salt may have been traded between several coastal sites for this reason.

During the early to late pre-ceramic periods (4,000–1,200 BCE), several Panamanian villages located in the Partia Bay were occupied simultaneously. These findings point to population increases in the area, and the transition of sites like Sitio Sierra from small habitats to large nucleated villages. Scientists speculate whether this contributed to the environmental degradation observed in the site's stratigraphy. Another hypothesis supported by isotopic evidence at the site suggests that the people of Sitio Sierra practiced slash and burn farming techniques that may have contributed to soil infertility and the loss of vegetation. Another curious element of Sitio Sierra is the large amount, and variety of bird fossils that cover the site. Many of the birds are now either extinct, or have habitats that are only observed in other regions of South America. Scientists ponder whether the birds had some religious or ideological complexities.

== Other related sites ==
Two rock middens located about 10 kilometers closer to the Pacific Ocean named Vampiros-1 and Vampiros-2 are thought to have been occupied anywhere from 7,000 to 11,500 BP. Scientists speculate whether it was used for the preparation of fish or for travel purposes as an ancient Paleo-Indian hotel. People may have lived in this area during Sitio Sierra's occupation as well, but it is more likely that the site was used as a relay point to preserve fish with salting techniques for the long walk or canoe ride back to the inland village(s). Studies done with aerial photography suggest that Vampiros-1 and Vampiros-2 were probably on the ocean shoreline during the time of Sitio Sierra's occupation. There is speculation that the Vampiros sites could have been later surrounding villages' original habitats, and scarce resources might have caused these people to move further inland at some point to gain the stability and sustenance of multiple resources. No terrestrial bones have been found in the older strata at Vampiros-1 or Vampiros-2.
