= Casa del Fundador Gonzalo Suárez Rendón =

Museum and monument in Boyacá, Colombia

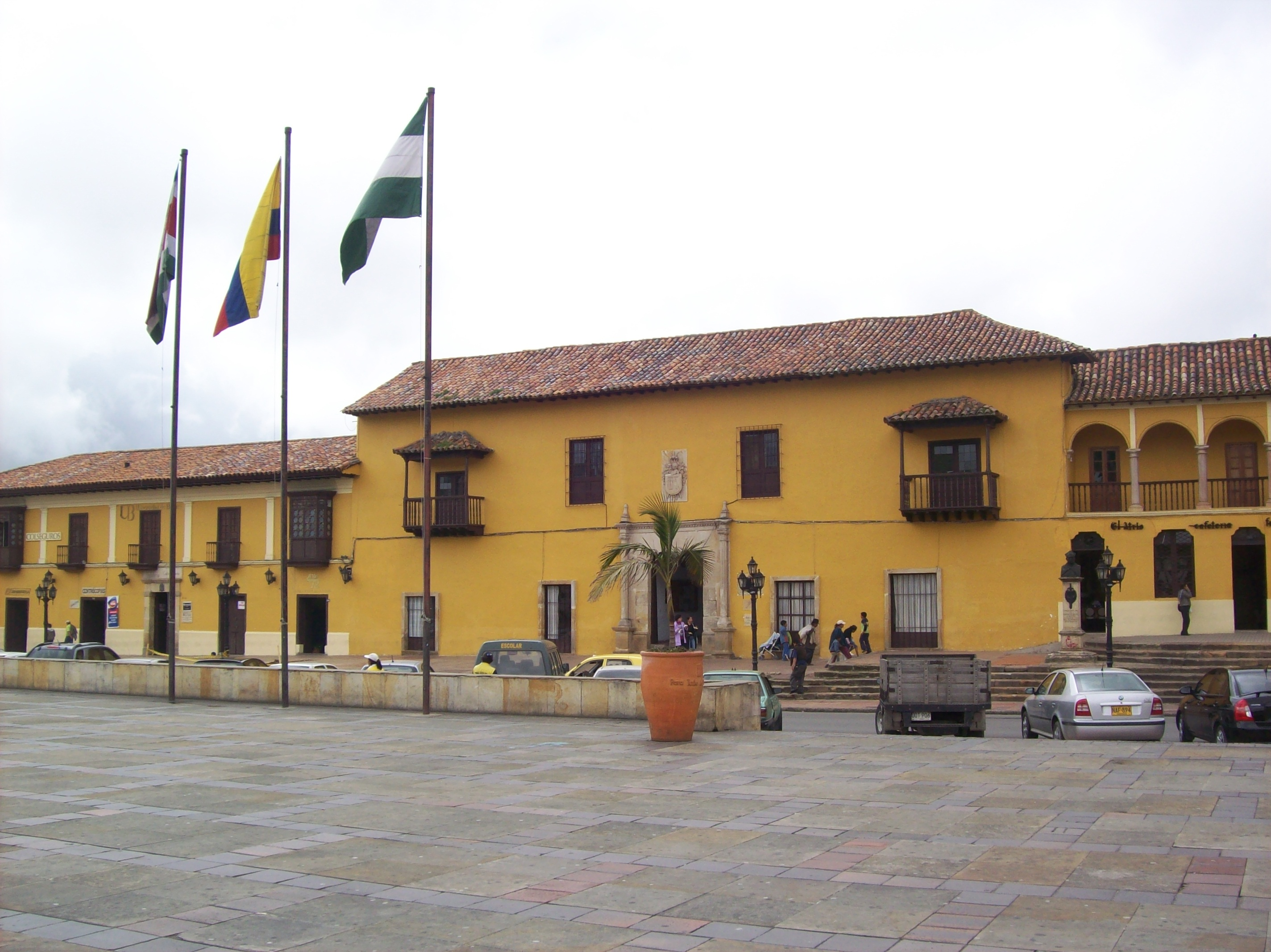
- Façade of the museum on the Plaza Bolívar

- Location of the museum in Colombia
- Established: 1540-1570 (as house); 1965 (as museum)
- Location: Carrera 9 No. 19-56; Tunja, Boyacá, Colombia
- Coordinates: 5°31′56″N 73°21′49″W
- Type: Art, history
- Collection size: 80
- Founder: Gonzalo Suárez Rendón
- Curators: Alcaldía Mayor, Tunja

The Casa del Fundador Gonzalo Suárez Rendón (English: "House of the Founder Gonzalo Suárez Rendón") is a museum and monument in Tunja, the capital of Boyacá, Colombia. It is situated on the central square of Tunja, named Plaza Bolívar, but historically called Plaza Suárez Rendón, honouring the city founder Gonzalo Suárez Rendón, who established Tunja for the Spanish Crown on August 6, 1539. The colonial building, declared a monument in 1959 and designated as museum in 1965, is the only remaining house of a city founder in Latin America and started construction in 1540.

== Background ==
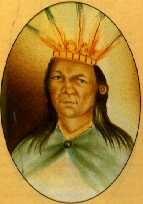
Hunza was conquered by the Spanish conquistadors on August 20, 1537, when hoa Eucaneme fled and his nephew Quiminza was defeated. It took another two years, until August 6, 1539, before the city of Tunja was properly founded as the second-most important Spanish city on the Altiplano Cundiboyacense

The Altiplano Cundiboyacense, the central high plateau in the Eastern Ranges of the Colombian Andes before the Spanish conquest, was inhabited by the Muisca, a collection of indigenous people who spoke a version of Chibcha; Muysccubun. Their egalitarian society and economy was self-sufficient and based on agriculture, trading with various surrounding indigenous groups and the mining of halite, giving them the name "The Salt People". They lived in small settlements of ten to one hundred bohíos scattered in the valleys of the Andes. Their system of hierarchy consisted of caciques and priests and the cacique of certain settlements were guarding larger areas. The main leaders of the community were the zipa based in Bacatá and the zaque based in Hunza, today known as Tunja.

In April 1536, a group of 800 conquistadors led by Gonzalo Jiménez de Quesada left the Caribbean coastal city of Santa Marta on a harsh expedition into the heart of the Andes. This journey, that took one year and the lives of eighty percent of their men, led them into what was called by early chroniclers the "Muisca Confederation". After submitting the southern Muisca who lived on the Bogotá savanna in April 1537, the troops split up and Gonzalo Jiménez de Quesada, his brother Hernán Pérez de Quesada and various others set foot to the northeast, where they reached the territories of the hoa in August 1537. hoa Eucaneme was defeated by the Spanish on August 20, 1537, in his bohío in Hunza. What followed were several other expeditions to parts of the Muisca Confederation and the foundation of the city of Bogotá on August 6, 1538, becoming the capital of the New Kingdom of Granada, as the colonial lands of the Spanish Empire was called after the home region of the brothers De Quesada in Andalusia, Spain.

Gonzalo Jiménez de Quesada embarked a ship in Cartagena with several other conquistadors for Spain in the first half of 1539 and left the control of the new colony in the hands of his brother. Under his command, various atrocities were committed against the caciques of the Muisca; Sagipa and Quiminnza (the successor of Eucaneme) were decapitated in public spectacles. One of the captains of Hernán Pérez de Quesada was Gonzalo Suárez Rendón, who was sent from Bogotá to Hunza, founding the city of Tunja as second-most Spanish colonial settlement on the Altiplano on August 6, 1539. The Spanish set up a system of encomiendas and Suárez Rendón became the first encomendero of Tunja.

== Description ==
The Casa del Fundador Gonzalo Suárez Rendón is located at the eastern end of the central square of Tunja; Plaza de Bolívar, previously called Plaza Suárez Rendón. The house, with present address Carrera 9 #19-56 between the cathedral of Tunja and the Universidad de Boyacá, was built roughly between 1540 and 1570 by 3000 Muisca for the city founder Gonzalo Suárez Rendón. The building is characterised by the cloistered staircases, the painted roof of the central hall and the use of marble.

The house consists of two floors and is built around a central garden (patio) in an L-shaped form, with view on the Tunja Valley. The ground floor is built with stone arches and the upper floor built with wood. The architectural style is Andalusian and the front of the building is adorned with a sign that says "Captain Gonzalo Suárez Rendón, founder of the city of Tunja, built this house in 1539". The building was constructed from 1540 onwards, on the site where the first reunions of the colonists were held in August 1539 and served as the house of the founder and his family. Indigenous chronicles state that the house was in an advanced stage of completion in 1562. In 1570, conquistador Luis Lanchero reported that it was one of the most luxurious mansions of the New Kingdom of Granada. Many conquistadors of the early days of the colony stayed in the house, among which Jerónimo Lebrón de Quiñones, Alonso Luis de Lugo, Hernán Pérez de Quesada and Pedro de Ursúa.

The house was made a museum in 1965 and hosts eighty objects of art and history. It is administered by the municipality (Alcaldía Mayor) and hosts a library.

== Gallery ==
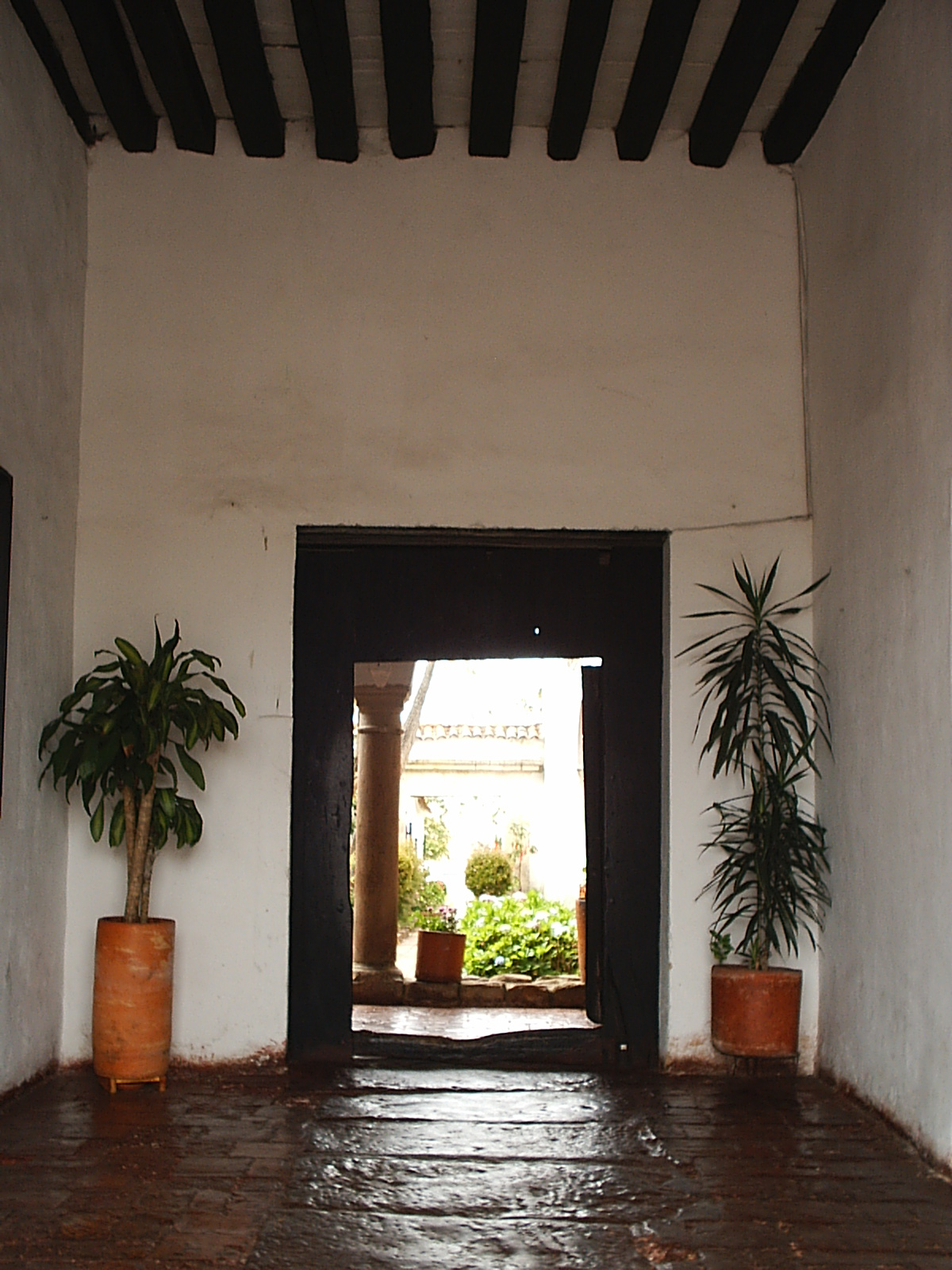
Entrance to the patio

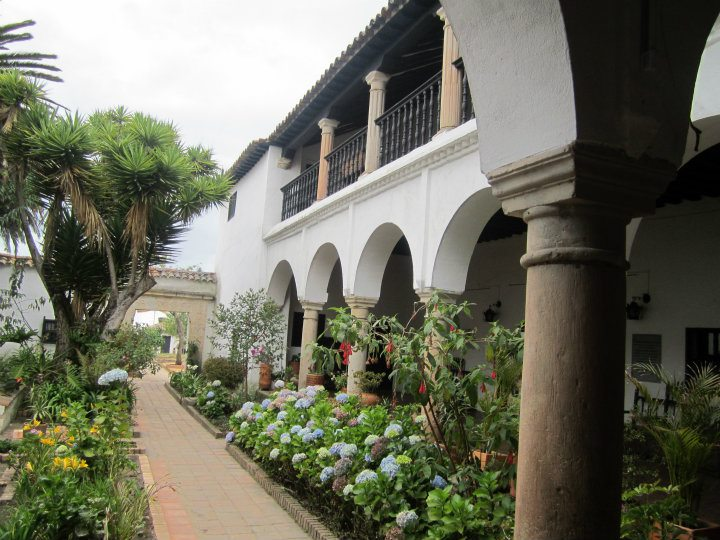
Archway and patio

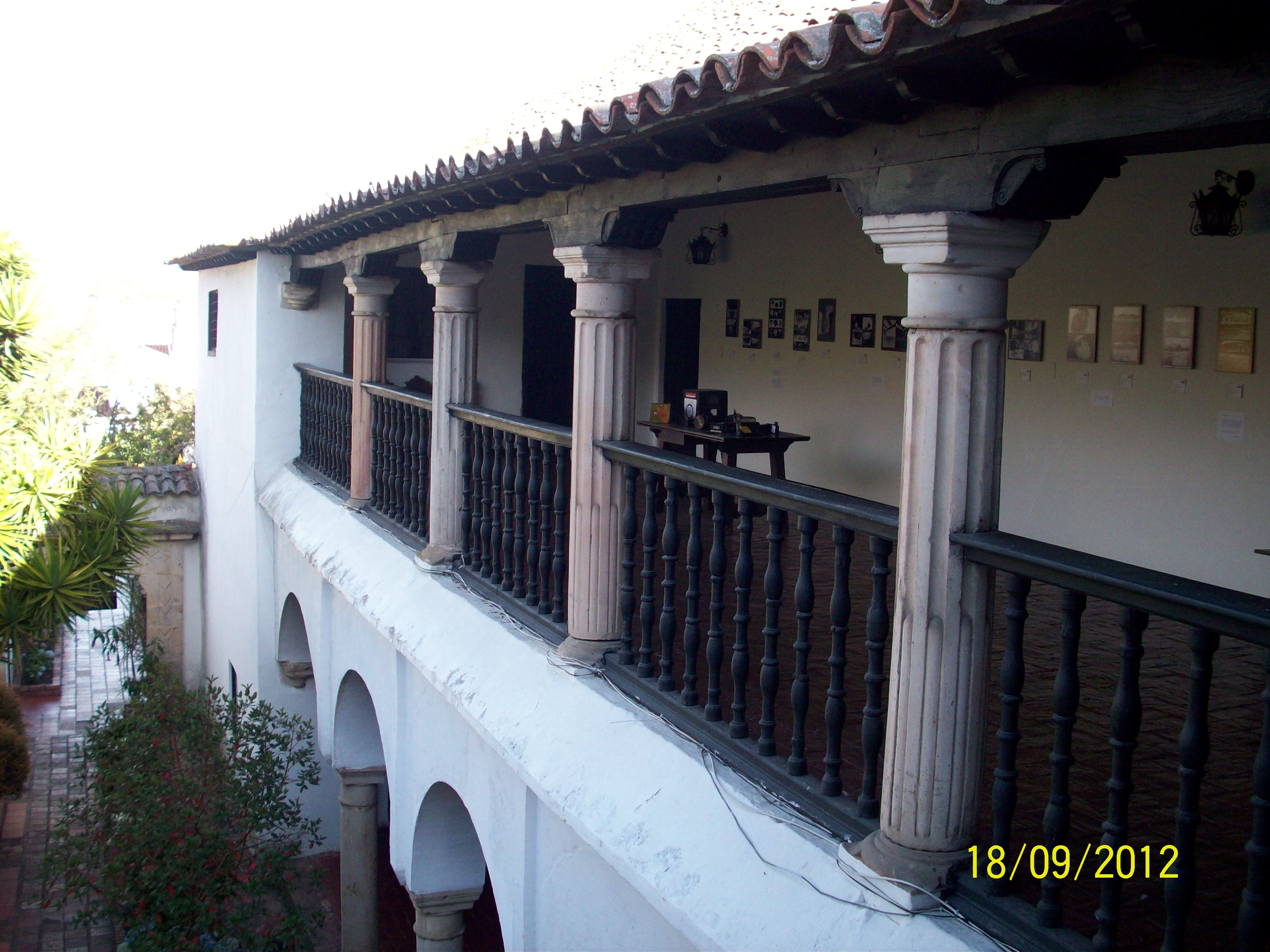
Balconies on the upper floor

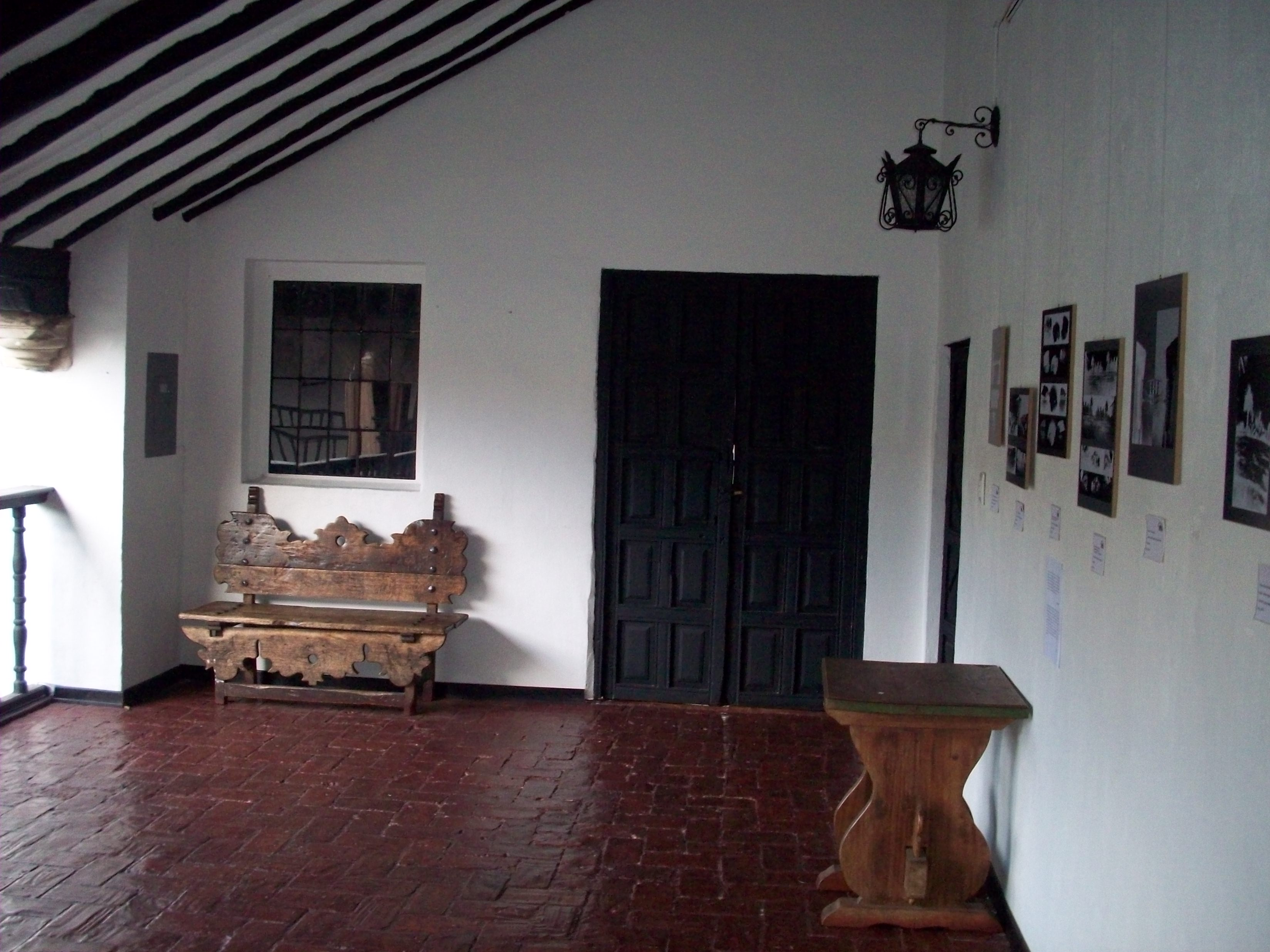
Colonial furniture at the entrance of the bedroom of Gonzalo Suárez Rendón

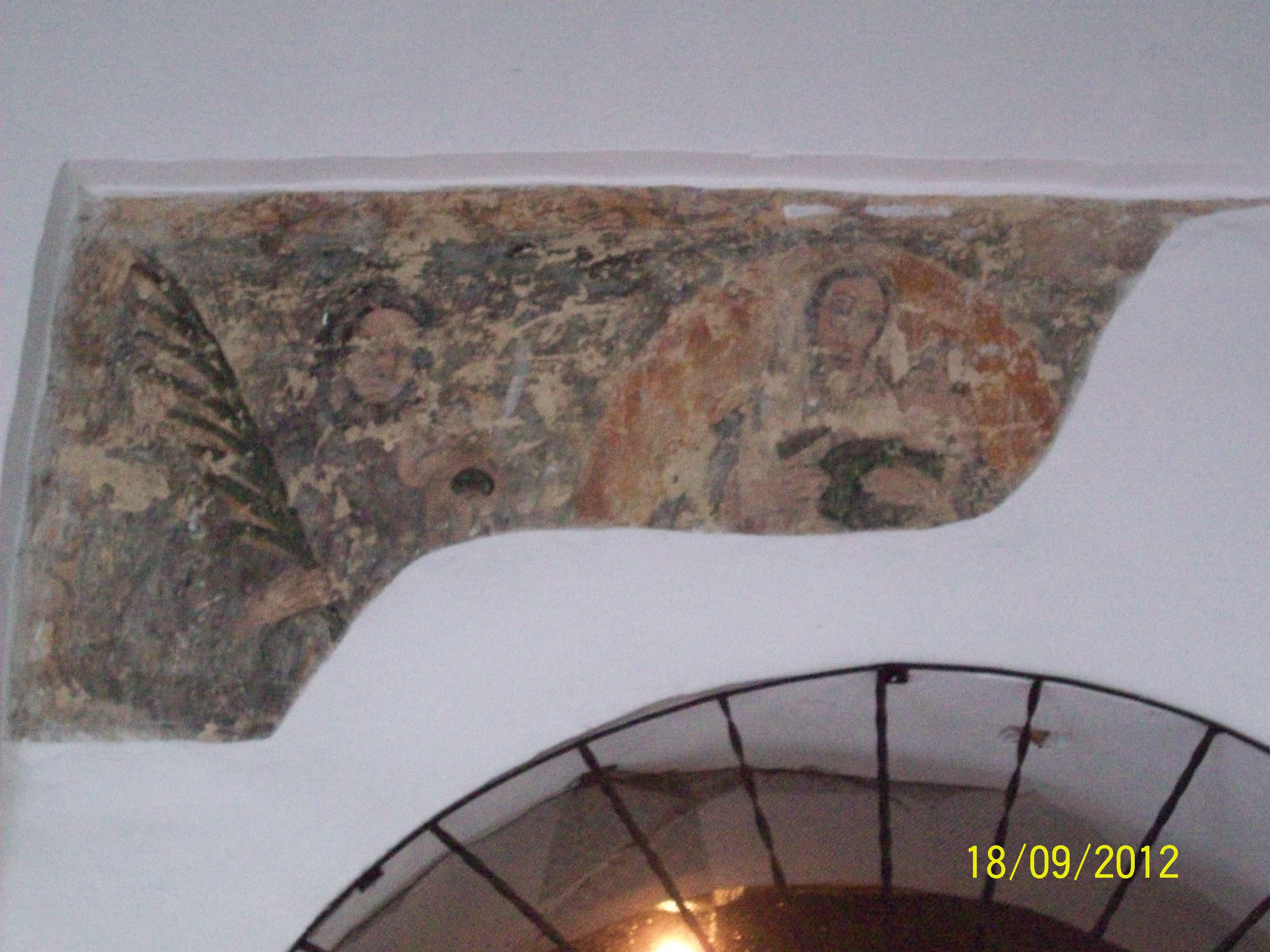
Mural in the house

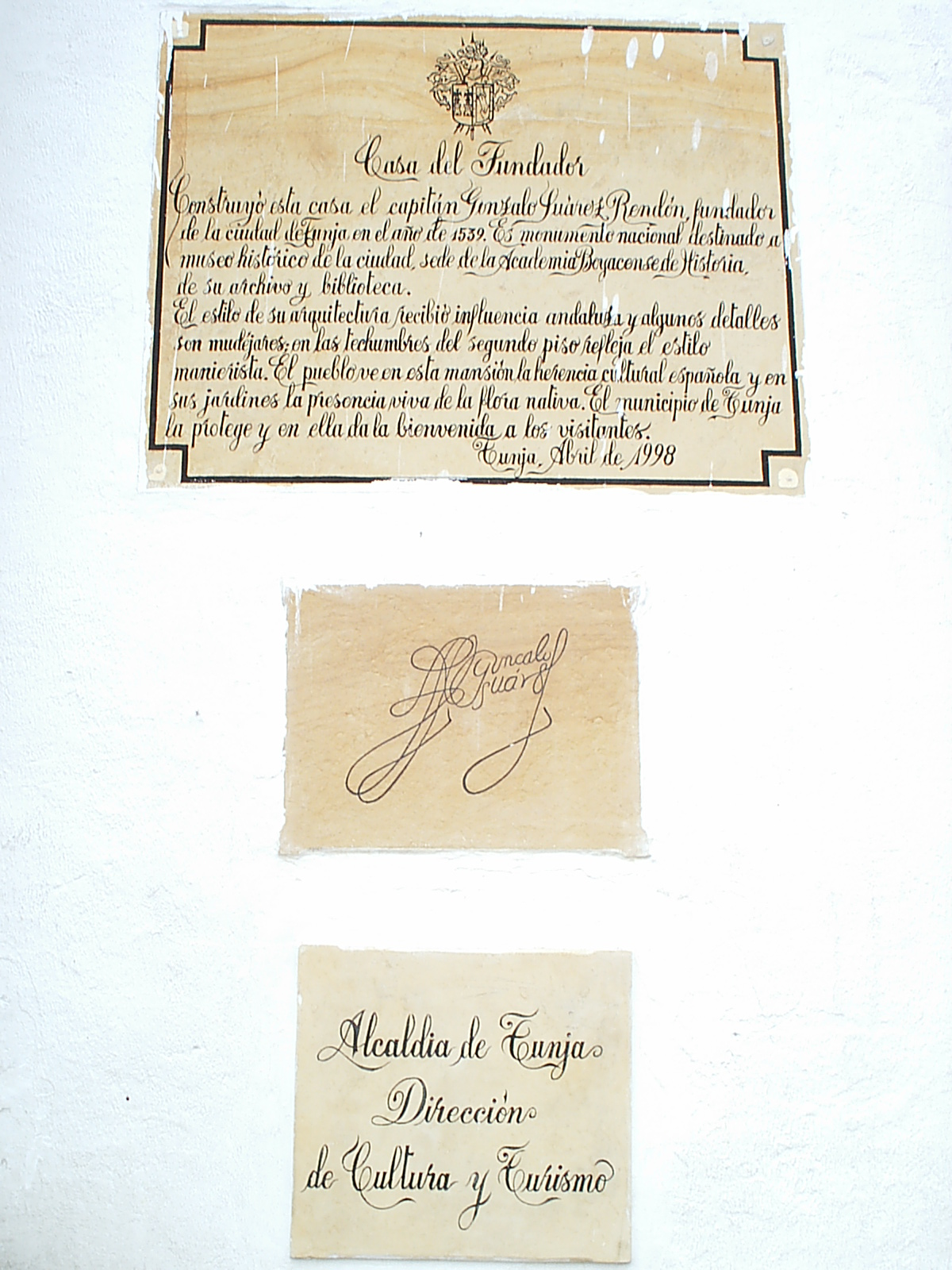
Sign at the entrance

== See also ==
- Conquest of Tunja
- Gonzalo Suárez Rendón, Archaeology Museum of Sogamoso
