= Hunzahúa Well =

Archeological site in Boyacá, Colombia

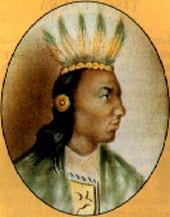
- Hunzahúa, after whom the Well was named

- Location within Colombia
- 5°33′13.92″N 73°21′22.44″W
- Type: Mythological site
- Periods: Late Muisca
- Cultures: Muisca
- Satellite of: Hunza
- Location: Tunja, Boyacá
- Region: Altiplano Cundiboyacense
- Part of: Universidad Pedagógica y Tecnológica de Colombia; Muisca sites

History
- Abandoned: Spanish conquest

Site notes
- Elevation: 2,715 m (8,907 ft)
- Public access: Yes

The Hunzahúa Well (Spanish: Pozo de Hunzahúa) is an archeological site of the Muisca located in the city of Tunja, Boyacá, which in the time of the Muisca Confederation was called Hunza. The well is named after the first zaque of Hunza, Hunzahúa. The well was called Pozo de Donato for a while, after 17th century Jerónimo Donato de Rojas. The well is located on the campus of the Pedagogical and Technological University of Colombia in Tunja. Scholar Javier Ocampo López has written about the well and its mythology. Knowledge about the well has been provided by scholar Pedro Simón.

== Background ==
During the time before the Spanish conquest of the Muisca, the central highlands of the Colombian Andes (Altiplano Cundiboyacense) were populated by the Muisca. This advanced civilization had its own religion and rituals, centered around the most important deities Sué and Chía. The northern territories were ruled by the iraca of Sugamuxi, the tundama of Tundama and the zaque based in Hunza.

== Myth of Hunzahúa ==
Hunzahúa, the first zaque of Hunza, fell in love with his older sister, called Noncetá. Because of the illegality of incest in the Muisca traditions, Hunzahúa fled with his older sister to Chipatá where he secretly married her. After the mother of both found out about this illegal act, she threw a stick to the couple that missed them both yet spilled the chicha over the ground, forming the Hunzahúa Well.

Hunzahúa and his older sister fled to Susa and there Noncetá bore his child who promptly turned into a rock. The rock was left in a cave nearby. Upon this, the illegal couple continued further south into the terrains of the zipa until the Tequendama Falls where they, tired and disillusioned, after hiding in the woods, turned into two stones.

=== Treasure of Quemuenchatocha ===
Decades after the mythological acts of Hunzahúa, his later successor as zaque of Hunza, Quemuenchatocha hid his treasures (mainly gold and emeralds) in the Well upon the arrival of the Spanish conquistadores. Donato de Rojas ordered his men to try to recuperate the treasures of Quemuenchatocha, but without luck.

Afterwards, more myths about the well surfaced; it would be bottomless or connected via a tunnel with the cathedral of Tunja.

== See also ==
- Hunzahúa
- Muisca religion
- Muisca mythology
- Cojines del Zaque
- Piedras del Tunjo Archaeological Park
- Sun Temple (Sogamoso)
- Moon Temple (Chía)
