= Pacanchique =

Character in pre-Columbian folklore

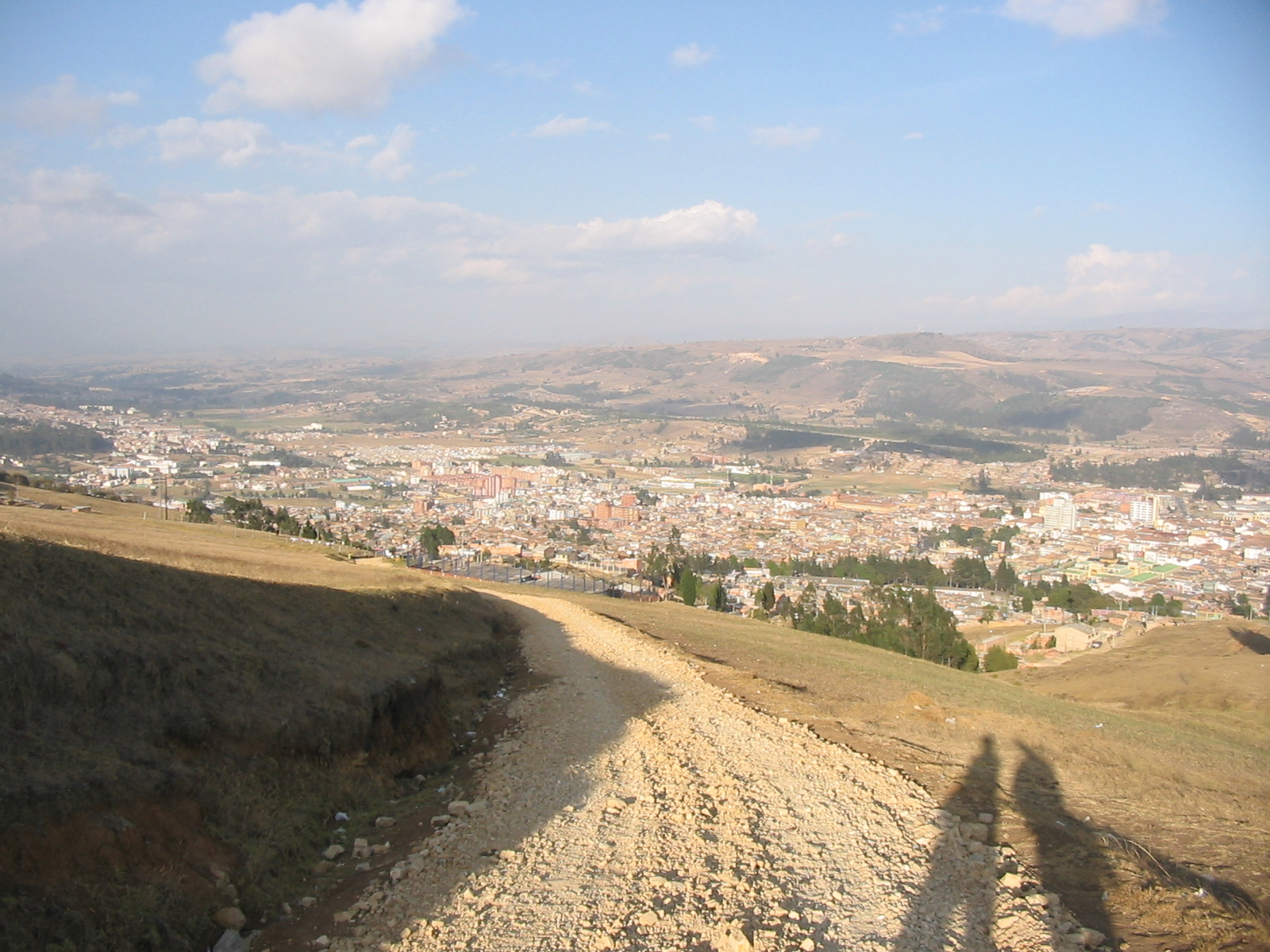
- View on Tunja from "Gallow Hill" where Pacanchique's father and fiancé were hanged

Creature information
- Sub grouping: Baganique
- Folklore: Muisca mythology

Origin
- Country: Muisca Confederation
- Region: Altiplano Cundiboyacense; Colombia
- Habitat: Ramiriquí

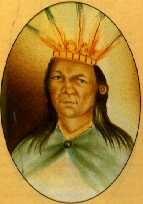
Quemuenchatocha, zaque of Hunza who allegedly kidnapped Pacanchique's fiancé

Pacanchique was a person in the folklore of the Muisca. He is said to have been the son of the cacique of Ramiriquí; Baganique. During that time, Ramiriquí was part of the zacazgo of Quemuenchatocha of the northern Muisca Confederation. Pacanchique's fiancé, Azay, is said to have been kidnapped by Quemuenchatocha and Pacanchique did all to get her back, eventually leading the Spanish conquistadors to Hunza to beat Quemuenchatocha.

== Background ==
In the centuries before the arrival of the Spanish conquistadors, the central highlands (Altiplano Cundiboyacense) of present-day Colombia were ruled by zaques (northern Muisca Confederation) and zipas (southern territories). Other areas were ruled by caciques, one of which was the ruler of Ramiriquí.

== Mythography ==
Pacanchique, who lived in the times of the rule of zaque Quemuenchatocha, had a beautiful fiancé, Azay. Quemuenchatocha organised pilgrimages to the Temple of the Sun, built by Goranchacha. At the temple human sacrifices were performed; young boys of twelve years old were offered to worship Sué, the god of the Sun of the Muisca. These rituals took place at the Cojines del Zaque ("Cushions of the Zaque"), two round stones of equal rock type, and were accompanied by music and dances with flutes, ocarinas, and drums.

At one of the celebrations, the delegation of Ramiriquí composed of the cacique Baganchique, his son Pacanchique and his fiancé Azay, together with other leaders of the area around Ramiriquí, came from Soracá to the temple to worship the Sun. The celebrations started at dawn; when Sué was rising in the east. Zaque Quemuenchatocha kneeled down on the Cojines to start the ritual. The hearts of the young boys were pulled out and sacrificed to the Sun, while Quemuenchatocha drank their blood. The zaque saw the beautiful Azay and ordered his servants to bring her to his palace (gran bohío) that night. The choice for Azay was considered a great honour according to the Muisca traditions and was arranged by the gods and Azay was captured that same night.

=== Pacanchique's artifices ===
Desperate for the loss of his lover, Pacanchique needed an artifice to get Azay back. After consulting his father, he went to the swamps of Soracá where the Muisca cultivated their medicinal and psychoactive plants. He took two types of plants from here and went to the palace of Quemuenchatocha where he found Azay crying for help. He gave her one of the plants and she immediately fell asleep. When Quemuenchatocha entered and found his conquered beauty dead, he and his shamans tried to save her life, but their attempts were unsuccessful. With a sad funeral march, Quemuenchatocha brought back the body of Azay to Baganique in Ramiriquí. There Pacanchique gave her the other plant he picked from the swamps and Azay came back to life.

When Quemuenchatocha found out his conquered lady was not dead, he sent his guecha warriors to Ramiriquí to find her and punish the culprits of the plot. Pacanchique fled the village but Azay and Baganique were captured by the soldiers and taken to Hunza. The protests of former friend Baganchique and his people were in vain; the zaque ordered Azay and Baganique to be hung at the gallows on "Gallow Hill". Shortly after the conquistadores led by Gonzalo Jiménez de Quesada reached the Muisca territories and found the hanging bodies. Pacanchique wanted revenge on the deaths of his father and fiancé and led the small army of De Quesada to the domains of Quemuenchatocha where he was found sitting in on his throne with gold, emeralds, and expensive cloths. Pacanchique also showed the Spanish troops the way to the Temple of the Sun in sacred city Sugamuxi. Pacanchique died close to Bonza by the sword of one of the Spanish soldiers.

Other chroniclers call Azay "Nagantá".

== See also ==
- Muisca
- Quemuenchatocha
- Muisca mythology, Goranchacha
