= Tunja =

- Municipality and city
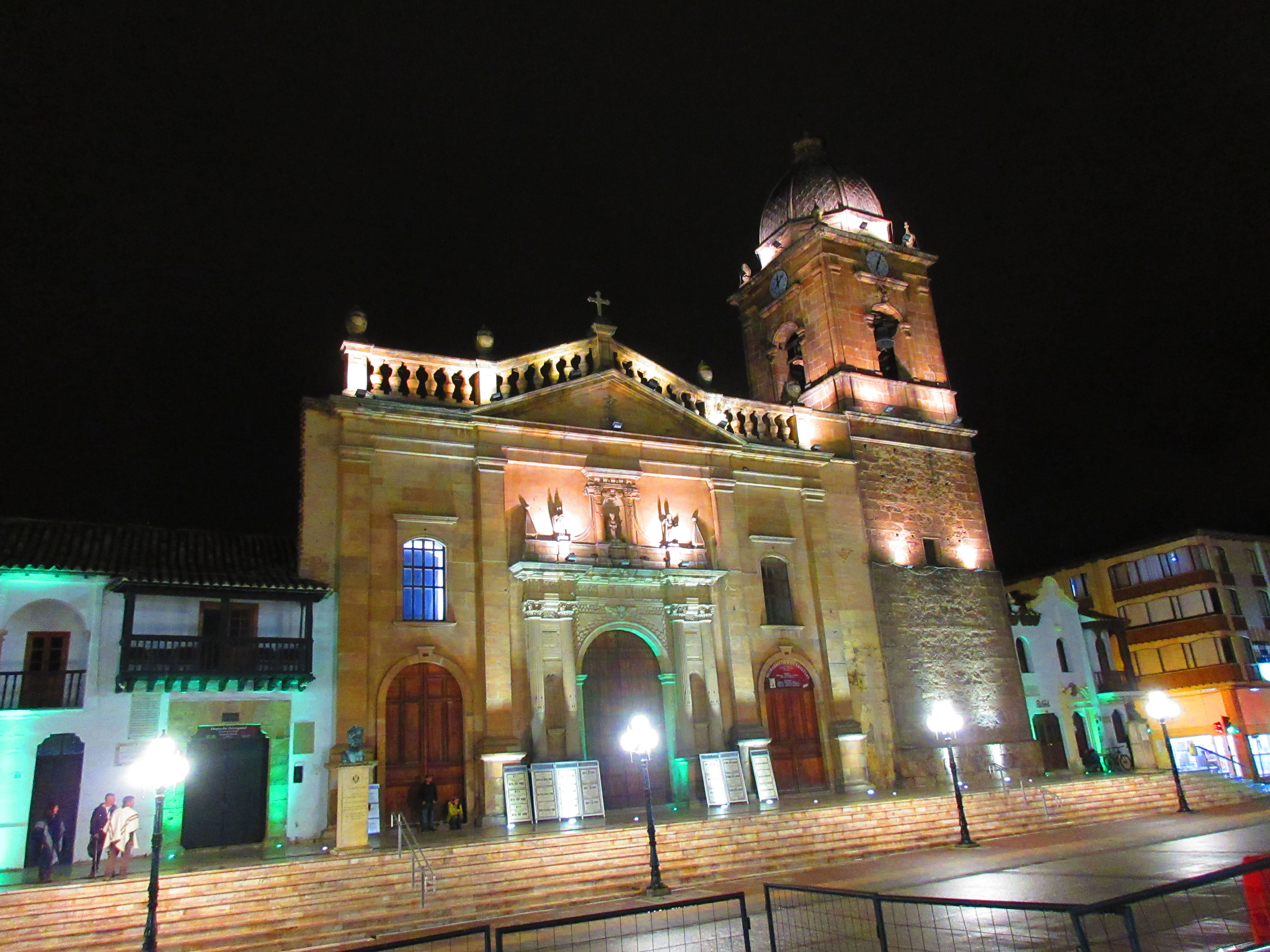
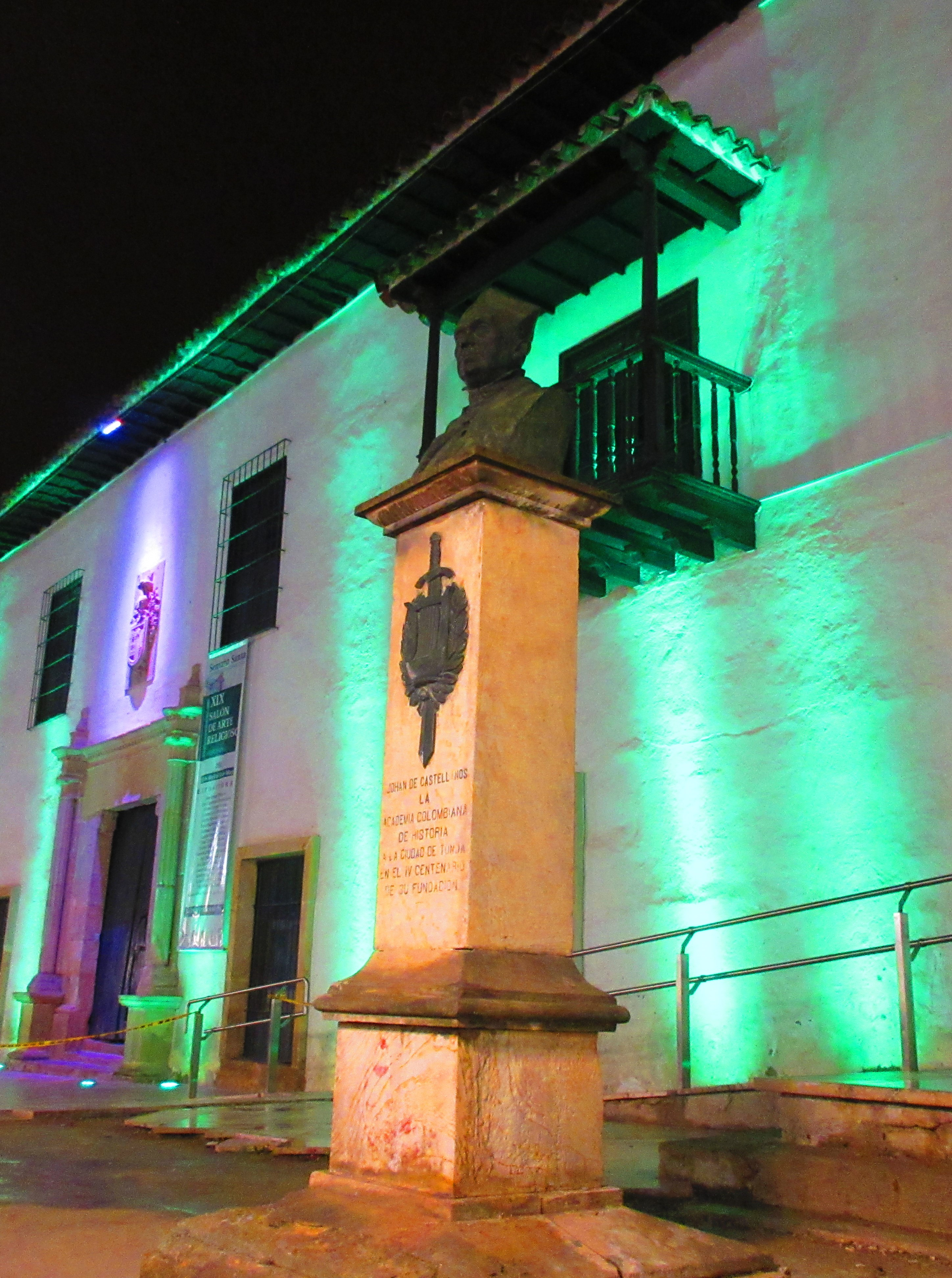
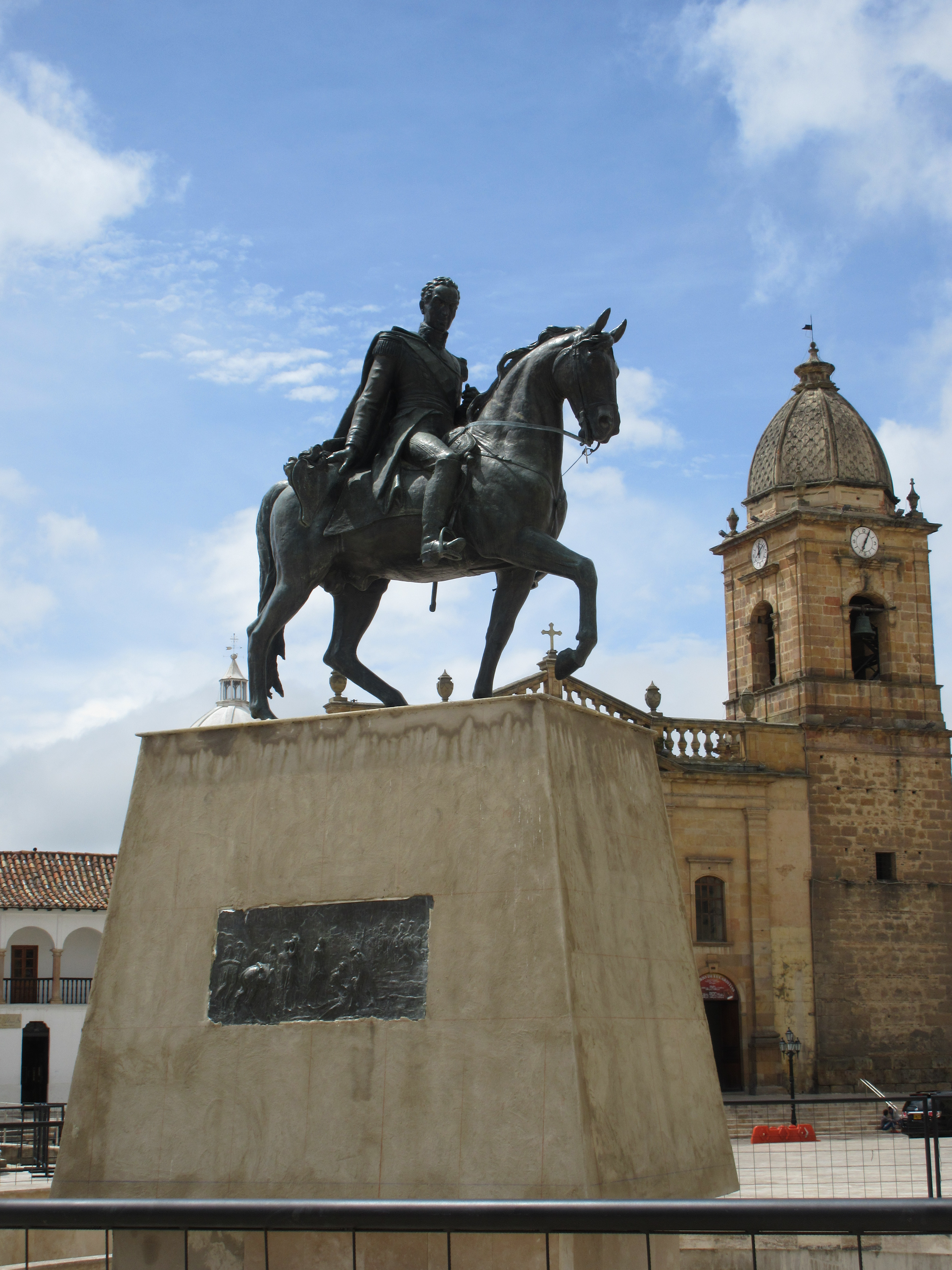
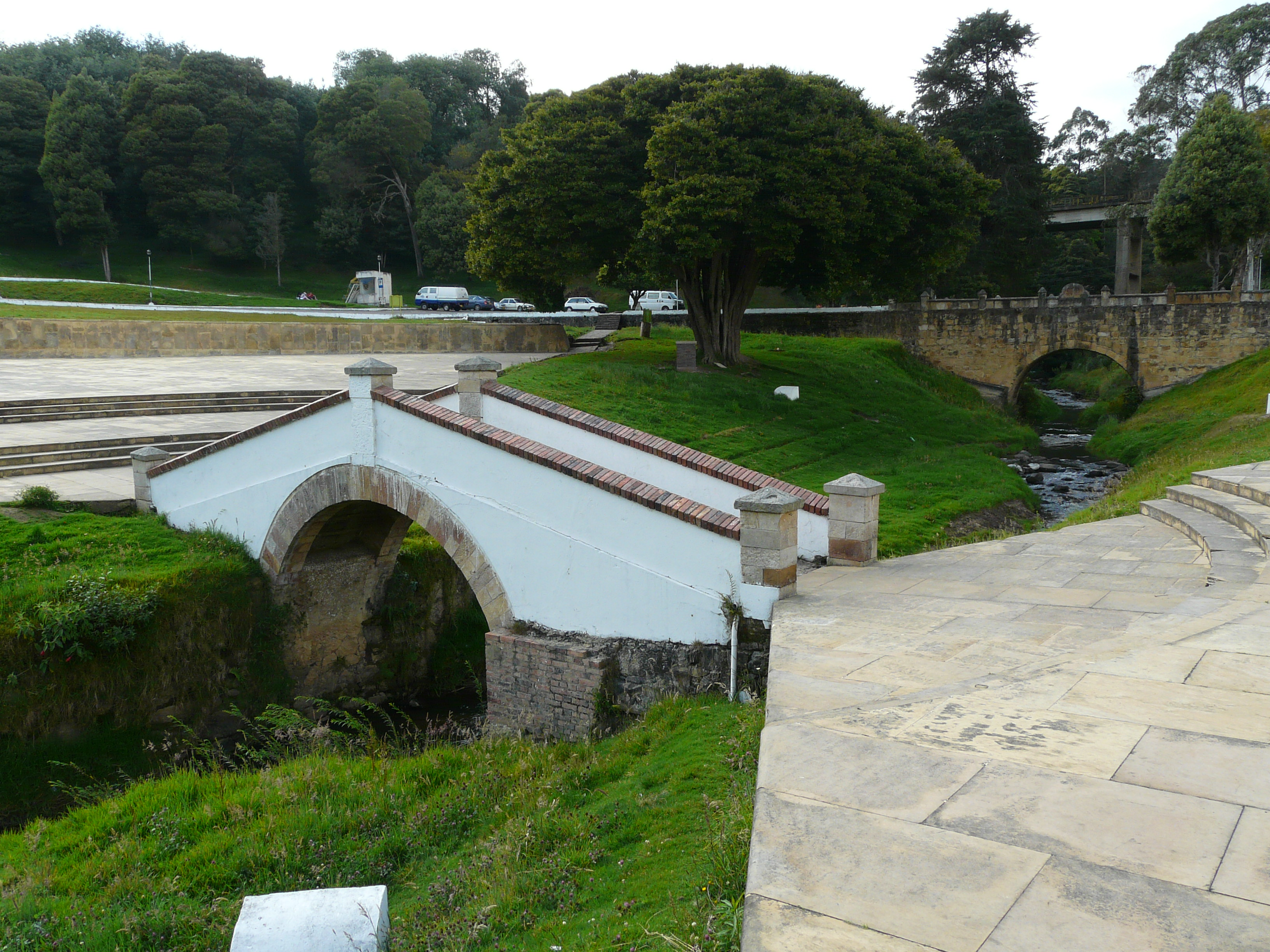
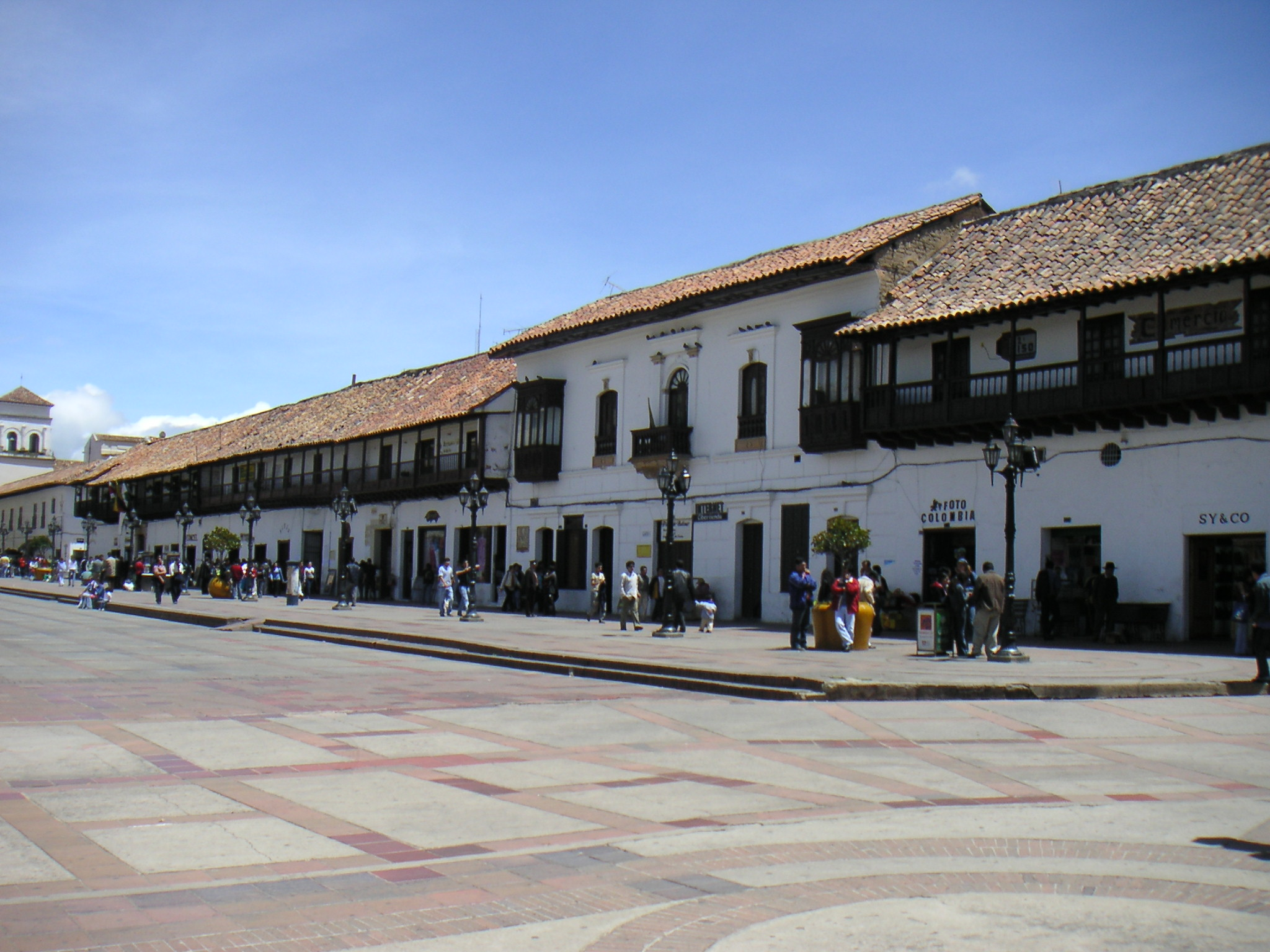
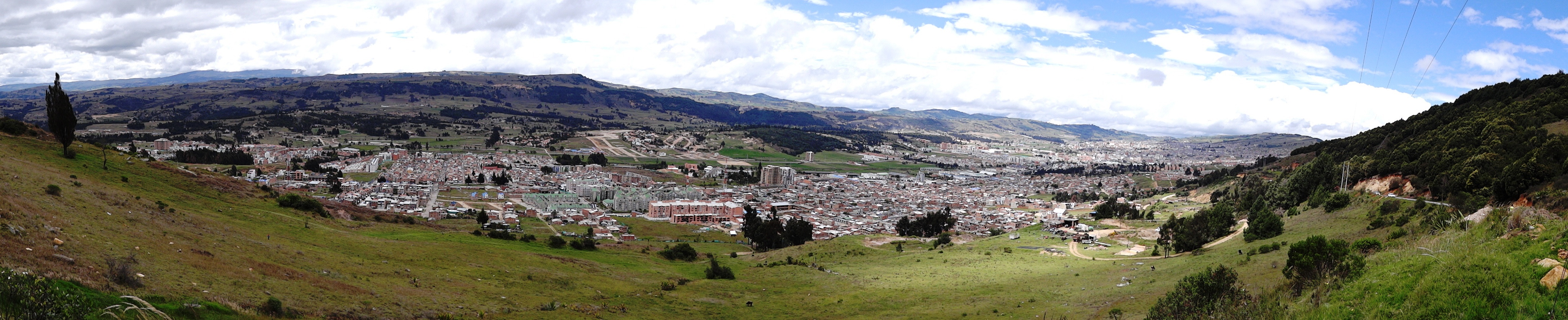
- Main Cathedral Bust of Juan de Castellanos in the Plaza de Bolívar de Tunja Statue of Simon Bolivar in the main square Bridge of Boyacá Tunja Central Square Panoramic from the north.

- Flag Coat of arms

- Location of Tunja in the department of Boyacá

- Location in Colombia
- Coordinates: 5°32′N 73°22′W
- Country: Colombia
- Department: Boyacá
- Province: Central Boyacá Province
- Founded: 6 August 1539 (487 Years ago)
- Established: March 29, 1541
- Founder: Gonzalo Suárez Rendón

Government
  - Mayor: Mikhail Krasnov (2024-2027)

Area
  - Municipality: 119.7 km^{2} (46.2 sq mi)
  - Urban: 21.51 km^{2} (8.31 sq mi)
- Elevation: 2,820 m (9,250 ft)

Population (2020)
  - Municipality: 179,205
  - Estimate (2026): 191,372
  - Rank: 33rd in Colombia; 24th (Agglomeration)
  - Density: 1,497/km^{2} (3,878/sq mi)
  - Urban: 214,651
  - Urban density: 9,979/km^{2} (25,850/sq mi)
  - Metro: 294,918
  - Locality/City: 177,700
- Demonym: Tunjano
- Postal code: 150001-150009
- Area code: 57 + 8
- Website: Official website
- IGAC - DANE - DIAN.

Tunja (Spanish pronunciation: [ˈtuŋxa]) is a municipality and city on the Eastern Ranges of the Colombian Andes, in the region known as the Altiplano Cundiboyacense, 130 km northeast of Bogotá. In 2018 the municipality had a population of 172,548. It is the capital of Boyacá department and the Central Boyacá Province. Tunja is an important educational centre of well-known universities. In the time before the Spanish conquest of the Muisca, there was an indigenous settlement, called Hunza, seat of the hoa Quemuenchatocha, conquered by the Spanish conquistadors on August 20, 1537. The Spanish city was founded by captain Gonzalo Suárez Rendón on August 6, 1539, exactly one year after the capital Santafé de Bogotá. The city hosts the most remaining Muisca architecture: Hunzahúa Well, Goranchacha Temple and Cojines del Zaque.

Tunja is a tourist destination, especially for religious colonial architecture, with the Casa Fundador Gonzalo Suárez Rendón recognized as the oldest remnant. In addition to its religious and historical sites it is host to several internationally known festivals and is a jumping-off point for regional tourist destinations such as Villa de Leyva, Paipa, and Sierra Nevada del Cocuy. It is a stop on the Pan American Highway which connects Tunja to Bogotá and Santa Marta and eventually to the northern and southernmost parts of South America.

== Demographics and geography ==
Evolution of the population of the municipality of Tunja
1500	~200,000
1636	50,000
1910	10,000
1928	19,000
1951	27,402
1962	68,905
1973	84,013
1985	93,245
1993	101,622
2005	152,419
2019	202,939

Tunja has a population of 172,548 inhabitants according to the 2018 Census. 0.1% of the city is indigenous, 0.4% is black, and 99.5% is white and Mestizo. It is located in central Colombia, at an elevation ranging from approximately 2,700 metres (8,900 ft) to 2,900 metres (9,500 ft). The city centre is at an elevation of 2,820 metres (9,250 ft) above sea level.

== Climate ==
Tunja's climate is influenced by its location and altitude. At almost 3000 m it is one of the higher cities in Colombia. As a result, the city features a subtropical highland climate (Köppen Cfb) with little variation in temperature throughout the year but a distinct dry season from December to February.

Climate data for Tunja (Pedagogical and Technological University of Colombia), elevation 2,690 m (8,830 ft), (1981–2010)
Month	Jan	Feb	Mar	Apr	May	Jun	Jul	Aug	Sep	Oct	Nov	Dec	Year
Mean daily maximum °C (°F)	19.6 (67.3)	19.8 (67.6)	19.8 (67.6)	18.7 (65.7)	17.8 (64.0)	16.8 (62.2)	16.4 (61.5)	16.7 (62.1)	17.7 (63.9)	18.3 (64.9)	18.6 (65.5)	18.8 (65.8)	18.3 (64.9)
Daily mean °C (°F)	13.3 (55.9)	13.6 (56.5)	13.9 (57.0)	13.8 (56.8)	13.5 (56.3)	12.7 (54.9)	12.2 (54.0)	12.3 (54.1)	12.7 (54.9)	13.2 (55.8)	13.4 (56.1)	13.2 (55.8)	13.1 (55.6)
Mean daily minimum °C (°F)	7.3 (45.1)	8.3 (46.9)	9.0 (48.2)	9.8 (49.6)	9.8 (49.6)	9.2 (48.6)	8.6 (47.5)	8.5 (47.3)	8.2 (46.8)	8.8 (47.8)	9.0 (48.2)	8.1 (46.6)	8.7 (47.7)
Average precipitation mm (inches)	18.1 (0.71)	27.4 (1.08)	53.5 (2.11)	81.3 (3.20)	85.2 (3.35)	55.0 (2.17)	49.1 (1.93)	40.2 (1.58)	50.0 (1.97)	86.0 (3.39)	73.9 (2.91)	32.8 (1.29)	652.5 (25.69)
Average precipitation days	5	8	12	17	19	19	19	18	16	18	16	9	177
Average relative humidity (%)	75	75	76	80	82	83	83	82	79	79	80	78	79
Mean monthly sunshine hours	229.4	192.0	173.6	141.0	136.4	132.0	145.7	151.9	153.0	155.0	162.0	204.6	1,976.6
Mean daily sunshine hours	7.4	6.8	5.6	4.7	4.4	4.4	4.7	4.9	5.1	5.0	5.4	6.6	5.4
Source: Instituto de Hidrologia Meteorologia y Estudios Ambientales

== History ==
=== Pre-Columbian era ===
The earliest evidence of human population on the Altiplano Cundiboyacense has been dated to approximately 12.000 years ago. Homus Tequendama inhabited the area by 6375 BCE. Archeologists have found human skeletons including arm bones in the area. Many archaeological discoveries were found in the area of the present-day city, dated to approximately 150 BCE.

During the 1st millennium AD, the territory was inhabited by the Muisca, who spoke Chibcha and emigrated from Central America through Panama to the Andean Region. The Muisca developed their own religion, calendar and mythology.

According to those myths, it was the brutal cacique and prophet Goranchacha who moved the capital for the northern Muisca from Ramiriquí to Tunja, then called Hunza.

=== Early Muisca ===
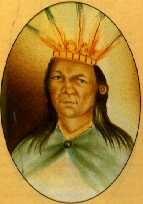
Eucaneme

An era when frequent battles among cacicazgos took place, peace was proposed for the region and an agreement was made among caciques to choose a supreme chief to rule them all. Hunzahúa, who came from Ramiriqui, was elected. The capital of his confederation was named Hunza. Hunzahúa took the title of hoa ("great lord", the same meaning as psihipqua who ruled from Muyquytá), and reign over the lands from the Chicamocha to Fusagasugá and from the Llanos de San Juan to Panche and Muzo frontiers, including Vélez territory. This helped to unify the Muisca, especially with respect to their language and religion, until zipa Saguamanchica broke this unity due to differences with the cacique of Guatavita.

=== Late Muisca (1490–1539) ===
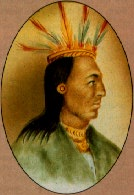
Aquiminzaque

Saguamanchica, with 50,000 soldiers, decided on a massive attack on hoa Michuá, crossing Guatavita and Chocontá, after which the Battle of Chocontá is named. Michuá dealt with him, supported by an army which doubled Saguamanchica, battling around three hours and killing both chiefs. A new hoa, Eucaneme, was installed, during the tense truce between Bacatá and Hunza.

In 1514, Eucaneme found out about the expansionist intentions of the new psihipqua Nemequene. He asked the caciques of Gámeza, Sugamuxi, Tundama and Sáchica to help him to reinforce his army. A battle was fought in Ventaquemada and, when Nemequene was about to become the victor, he was fatally wounded and his troops retreated. Iraca retracted his support and Eucaneme got a truce whose terms would end when the Spanish arrived. When Eucaneme found out the Europeans were around his lands, he decided to stay in Hunza and avoided any aggression against the invaders. He forbade under strict penalties to show the conquistadors the path to his headquarters and when he knew they were reaching him, he sent them gifts and peacemakers, hoping to stop them while he was hiding his treasures.

==== Hunza in Muisca history ====
History of the Muisca
Altiplano	Muisca	Art	Architecture	Astronomy	Cuisine	El Dorado	Subsistence	Women	Conquest

=== Spanish colony (1539-1811) ===
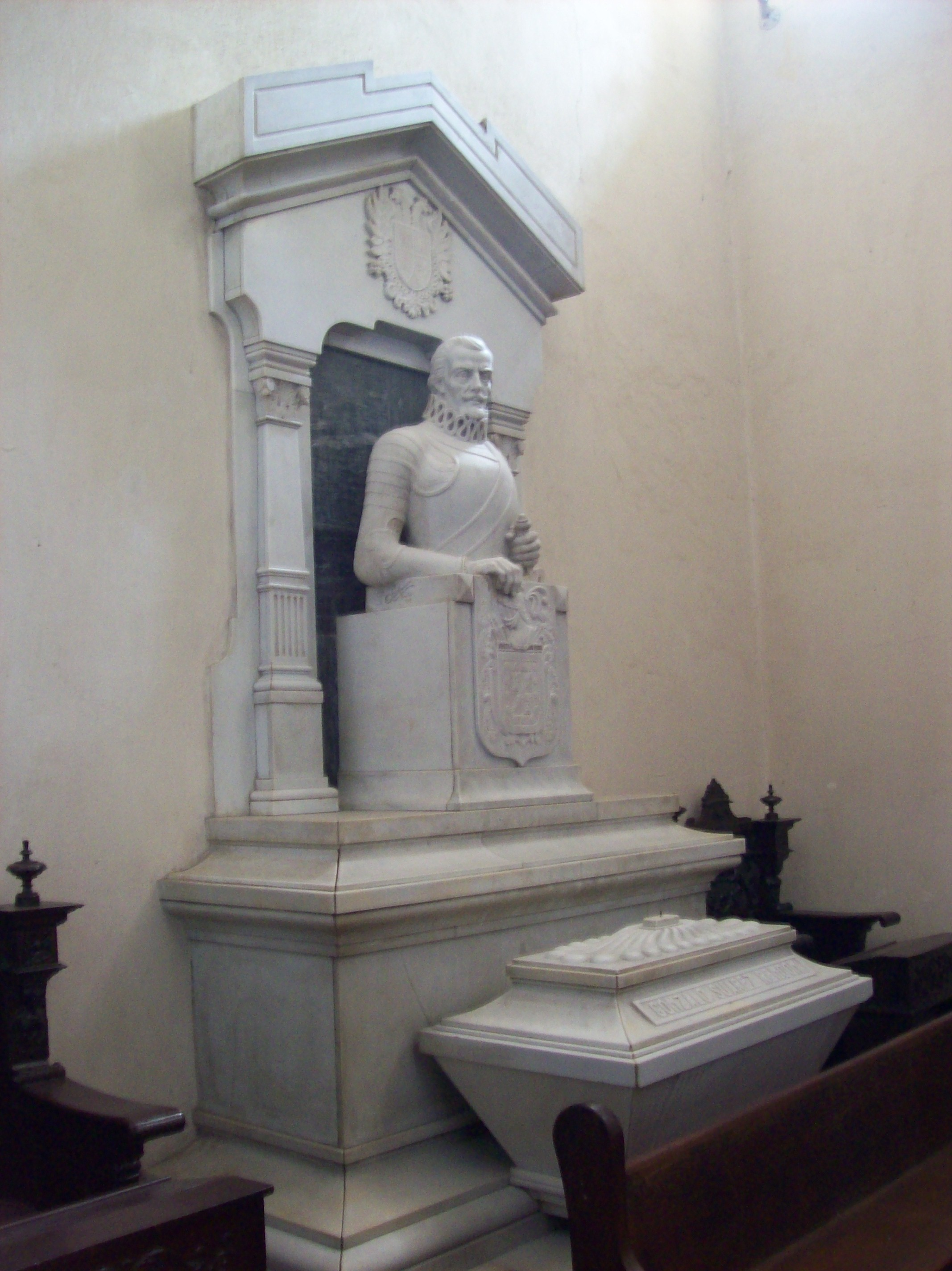
Tomb of Gonzalo Suárez Rendón

==== Spanish Discovering of Hunza (1537) ====
Gonzalo Jiménez de Quesada parted from Santa Marta in April 1536, on the first main expedition into the Andes. His main goal was to find and conquer El Dorado. After months of traveling, he found many Muisca cacicazgos in the Altiplano Cundiboyacense. In his search, he acquired information about emerald discoveries and other treasures in Somondoco and the Llanos. On August 20, 1537, the conquerors arrived, with horses and dogs. Jiménez de Quesada arrived at the headquarters of Quemuenchatocha, finding him in a chair, dressed in gold in the same way as his companions who ran off, leaving him alone. The gold, the emeralds and the fancy fabrics were taken. This conquest took place where later the San Agustin Convent was built. Quemuenchatocha was taken to Suesca, with the hope he would reveal where he hid the rest of his treasure. He abdicated in favour of his nephew Aquiminzaque and retired to Ramiriquí where he died.

==== Invasion of Hunza (1538-1539) ====
The Spanish Invasion of the territory begins when Jimenez de Quesada captures Quemuenchatocha who is succeeded in life by the young Aquiminzaque. The latter, along with his tribe were taken as an encomienda by Hernán Pérez de Quesada. The new zaque did not show belligerent in front of the Spaniards, and later himself converted to Catholicism. The continuous and numerous demands made by the Spaniards started to create discomfort among the Muisca population.

Aquiminzaque should verify his nuptials with the daughter of the cacique of Gameza and many chiefs decided to go the solemn ceremony. A rumour came to Perez de Quesada that the occasion would be used as an insurrection, for which he apprehended Aquiminzaque and all the caciques, among them the ones from Toca, Motavita, Samacá, Turmequé and Sutamarchán, and condemn them to death. In 1540, the Zaque was beheaded and his death marked the end of the dynasty of zaques of Hunza. In the same way, it points to the disintegration and dispersion of natives in encomiendas along the new Tunja Province.

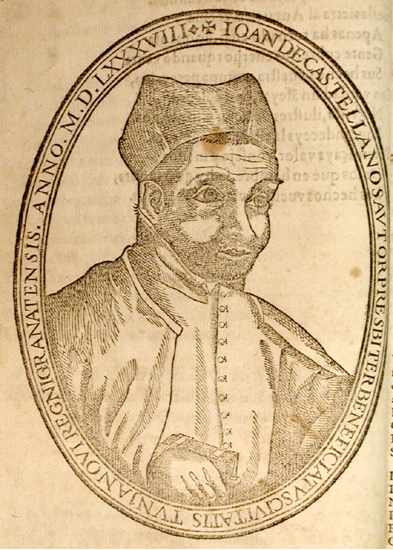
Don Juan de Castellanos

==== City Foundation (1539-16th Century) ====
The Spanish city of Tunja was founded on the lands of Quemuenchatocha, where later the convent of San Agustin was built. Founded by Captain Gonzalo Suarez Rendón, on August 6, 1539, the main square was established, also a yard for the church and public buildings around the square; in 1550, the city outlines were consolidated. The same year, The franciscans arrive to the city, and the Dominicans a year later, the Augustinians in 1585 and the Jesuits in 1611; To the foundation, 77 yards are added and divided, along with 70 vegetable gardens, 11 estates and 44 stables. Only until 1616 two parishes are built to receive mestizos and Indians during colonial period: Santa Barbara, at southwest and Las Nieves, at north.

== Security and living conditions ==
Tunja has the lowest homicide rate in Colombia and is below average in Latin America according to the report from the International Centre of the Prevention of Crime for 2010. 2 homicides per 100,000 inhabitants in 2015 makes the city one of the safest in the Americas. According to other sources, this value is four times lower than the national average. Tunja is an example of a safe city.

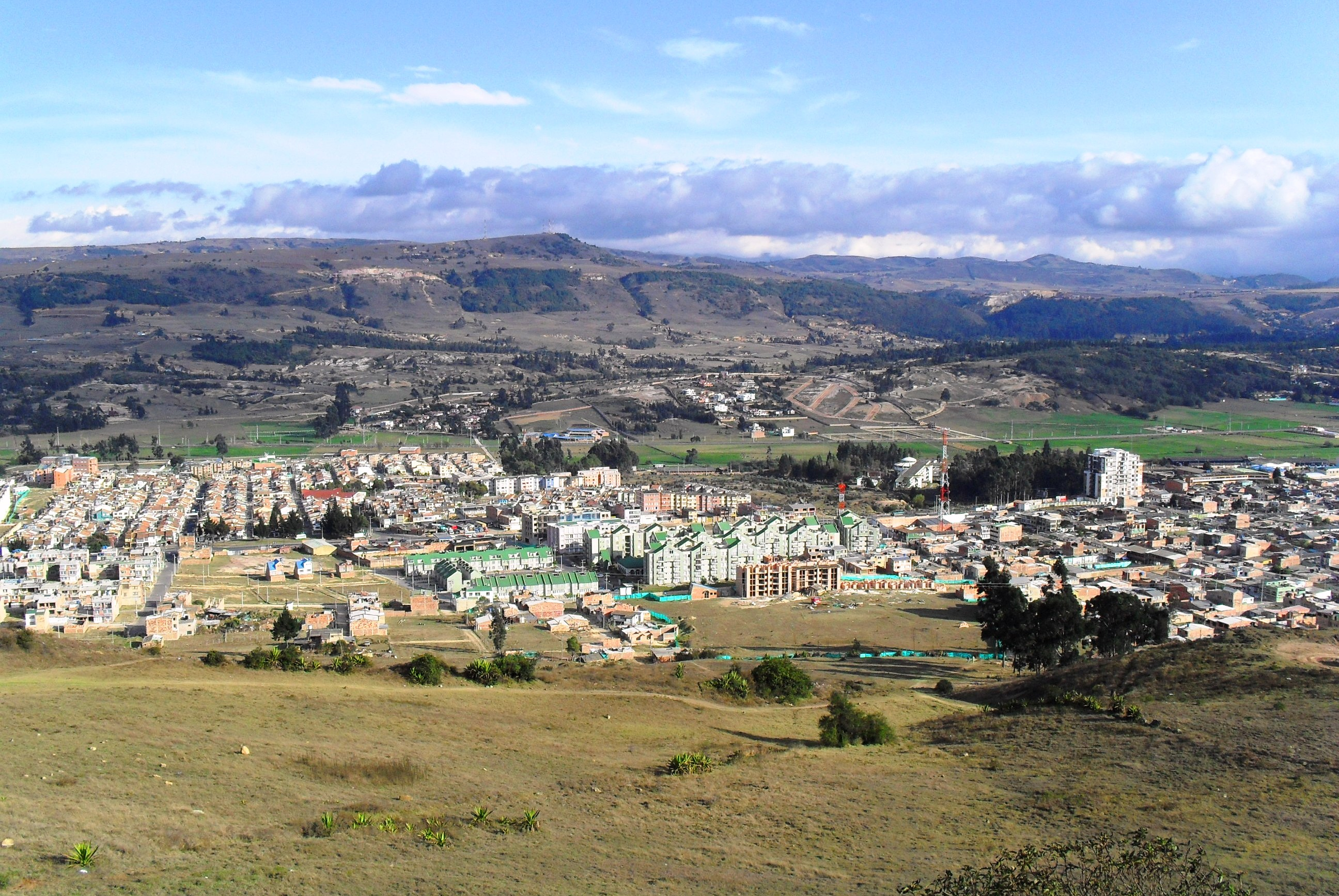
Northern zone

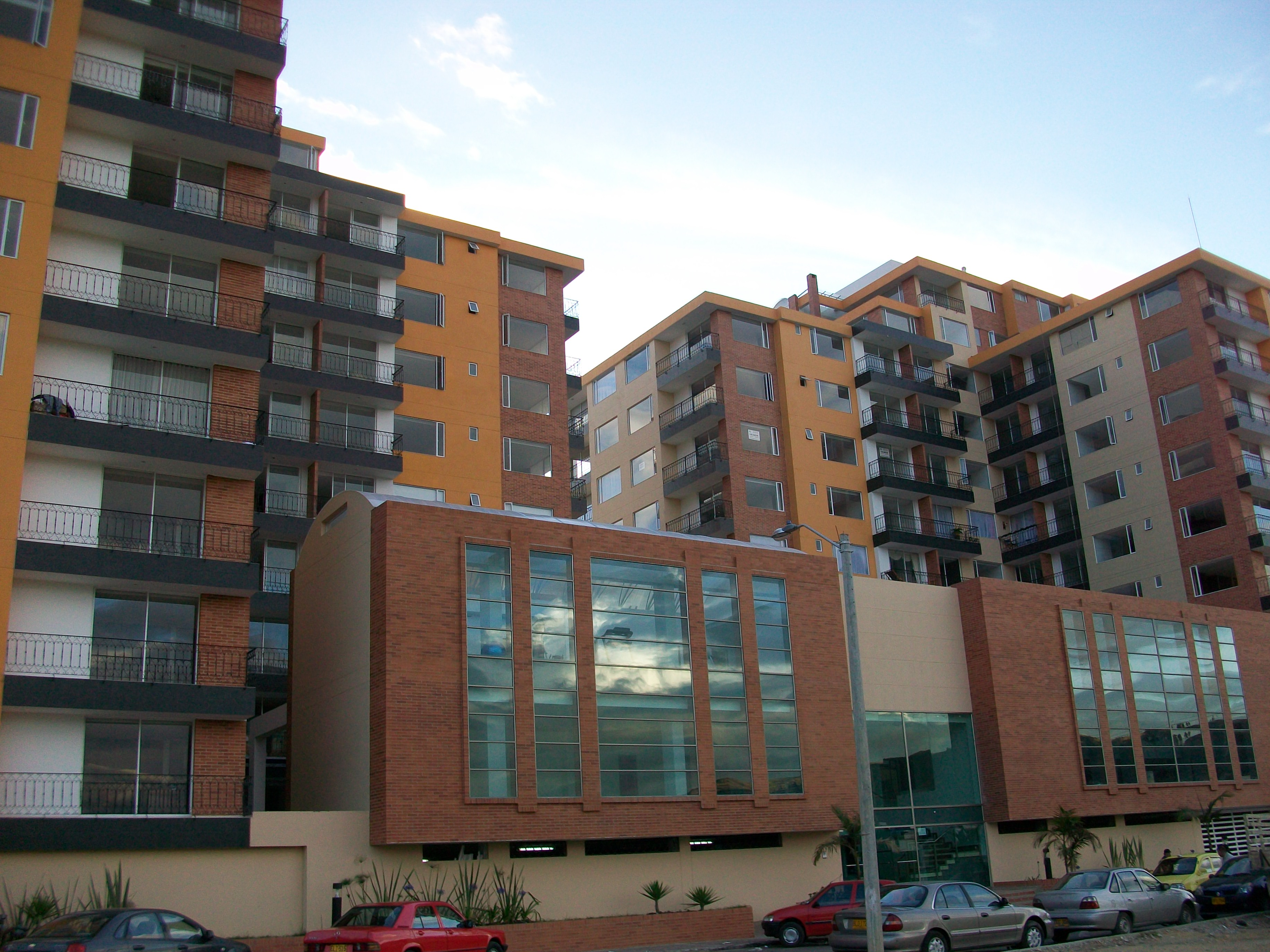
Emerald Quarter

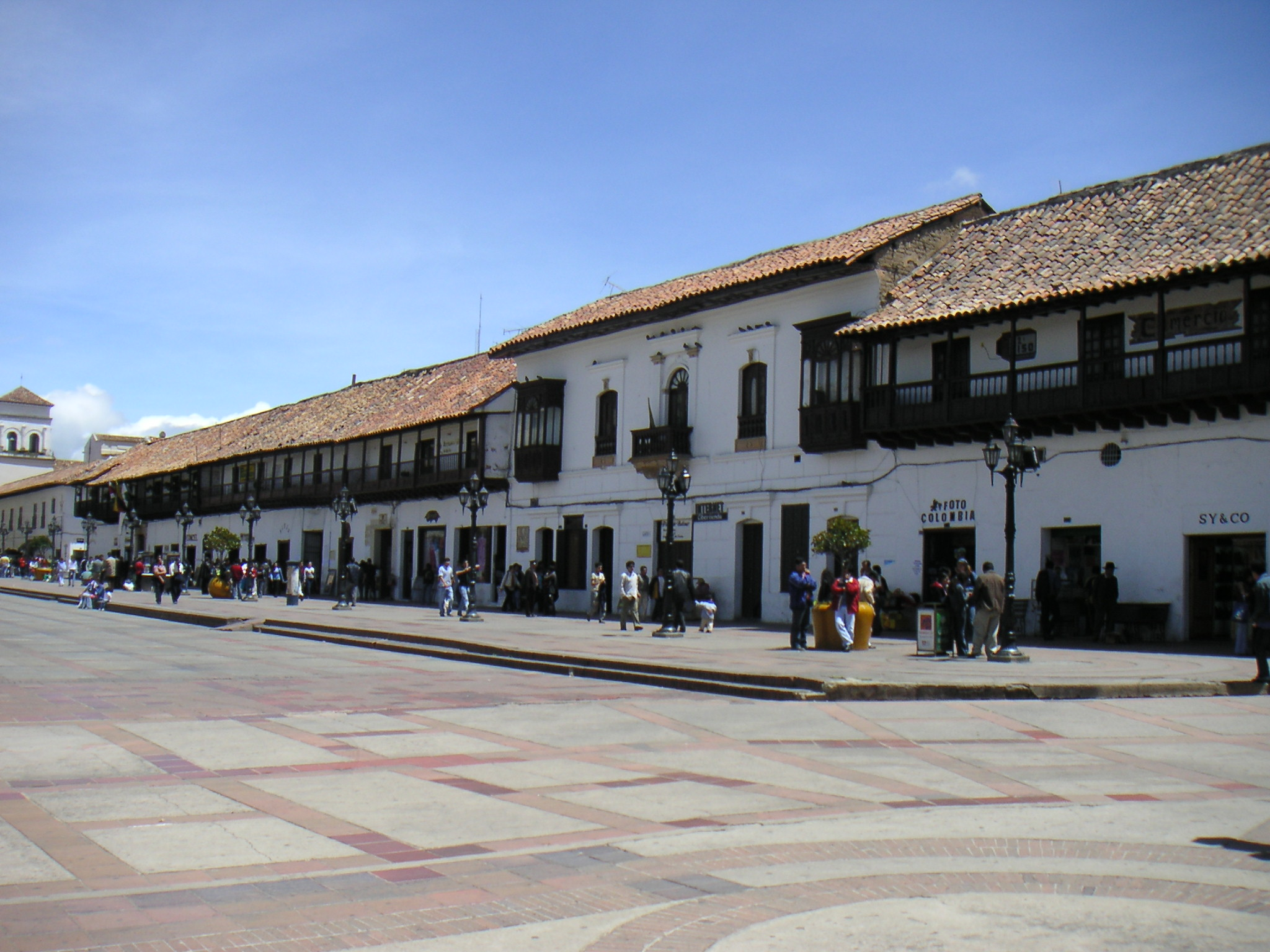
Bolivar Square, Downtown

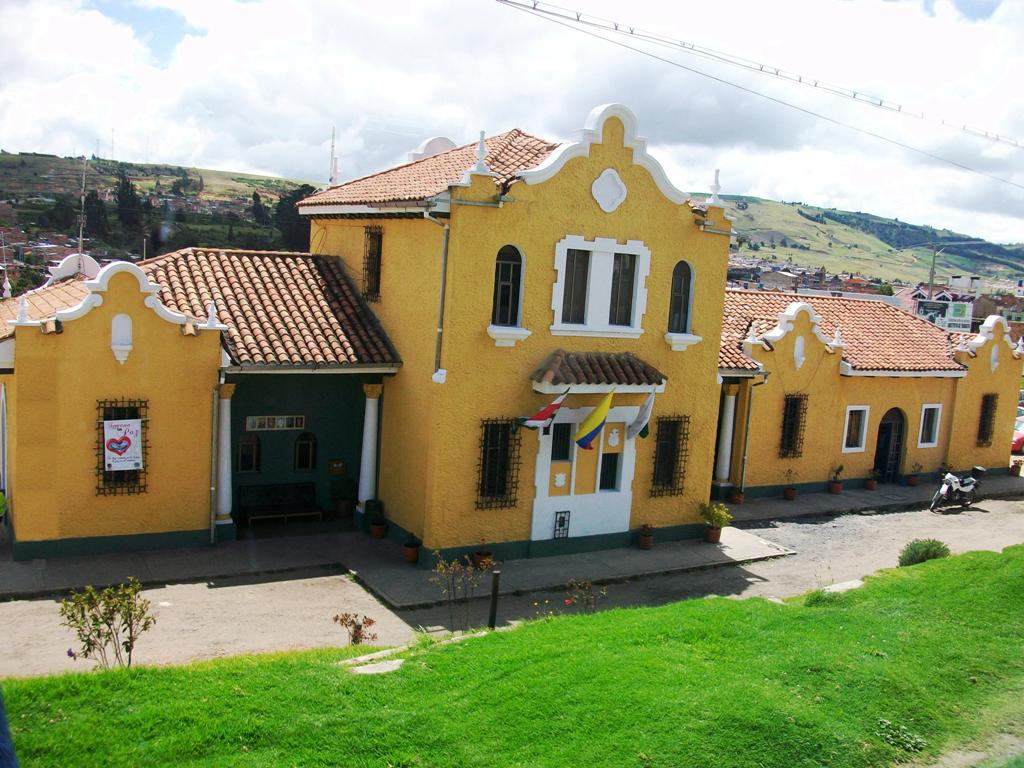
Train station, the historic center DHC Tunja

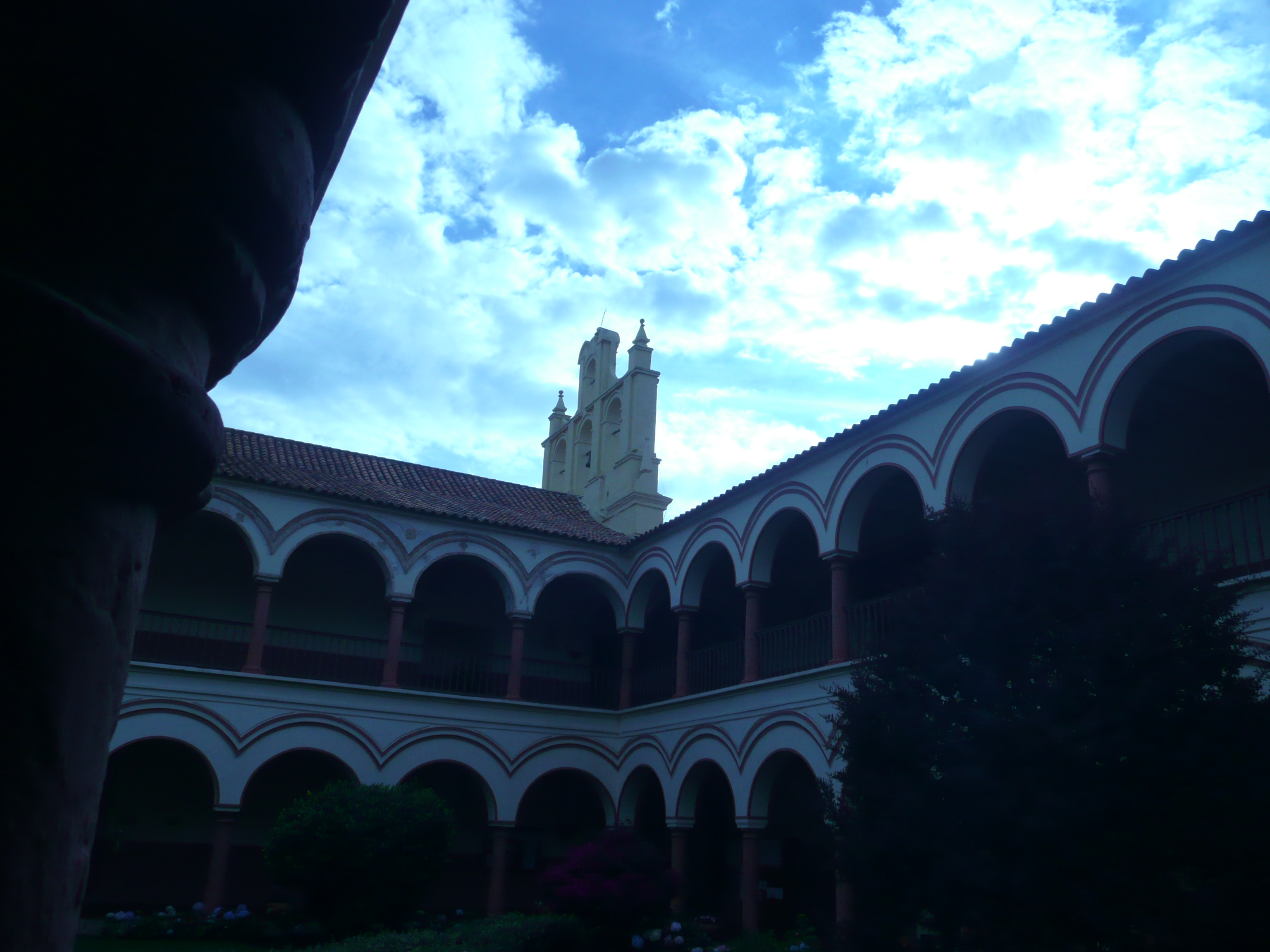
San Agustin Convent

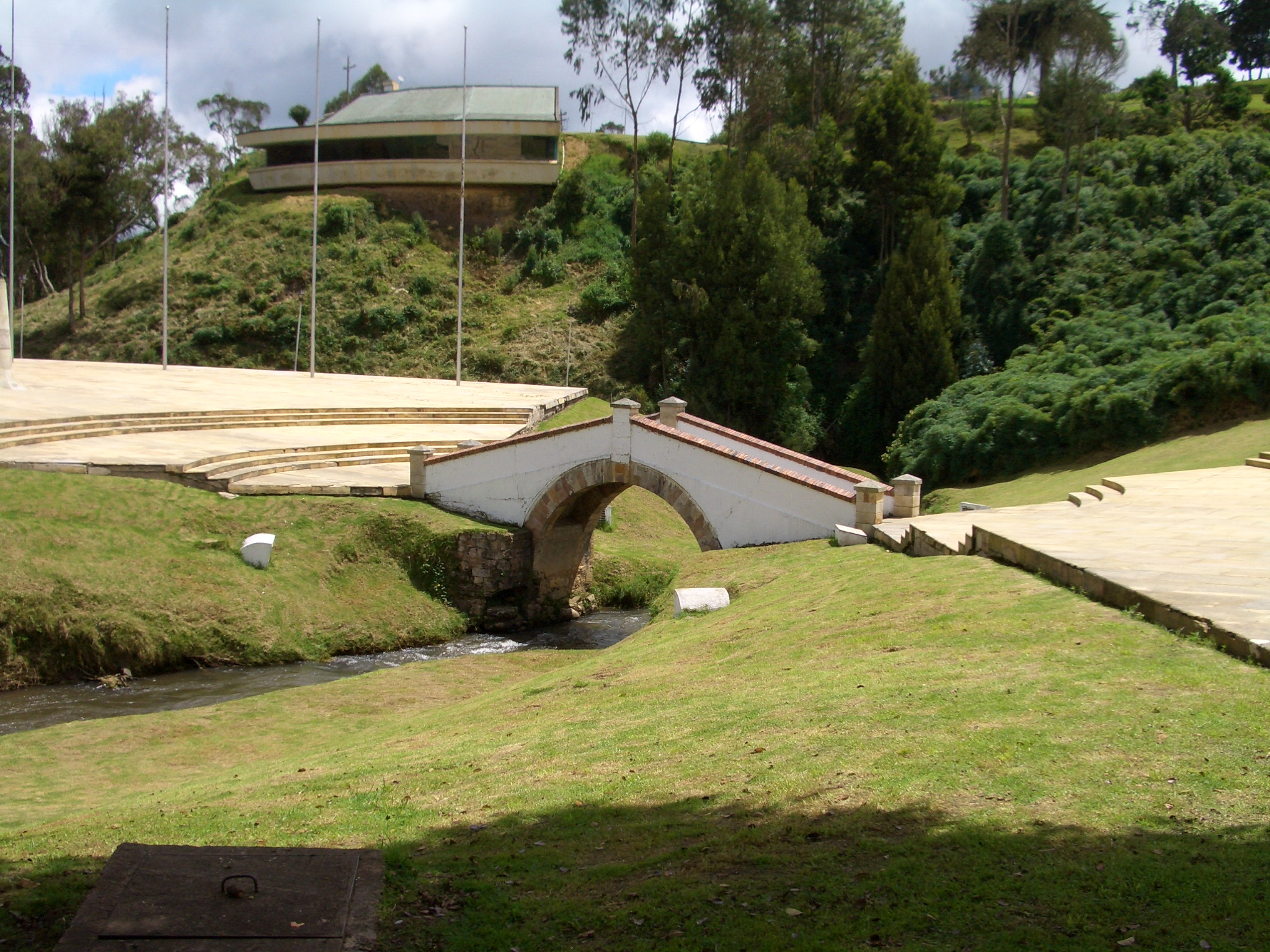
Boyaca Bridge in Tunja, the site where Colombian independence was won

== Tourism ==
=== Relevant historical and tourist sites ===
The streets are named according to 472 and Google Maps nomenclatures — (C: calle), (K: carrera), (S: south), (E: east), (A: ave).

Southern Sector

English Name	Spanish Name	Address
Bridge of Boyaca	Puente de Boyacá	Rural Area (La Lajita)
Flower Pot Monument	Los Tiestos	K14-C16
Mushroom Monument	Los Hongos	A Oriental
St. Martin's Church	Iglesia de San Martín	Libertador Neighborhood
Bullfighting arena	Plaza de Toros	K8-C13S

Eastern Sector

English Name	Spanish Name	Address
Botanical Garden	Jardín Botánico	BTS Highway (Autopista Circunvalar BTS)
St. Anthony's Church	Iglesia de San Antonio	San Antonio Neighborhood
Governorate Viaduct	Viaducto Paseo de La Gobernación	BTS-A.Olímpica
JNN Viaduct	Viaducto Jose Nepomuceno Niño	C24-Universitaria

Downtown

English name	Spanish name	Address
Las Nieves Church and Square	Iglesia y Plazoleta de las Nieves	K10-C22
St. Ignatius' Church	Iglesia de San Ignacio	K10-C18
*St. Barbara's Church	Iglesia de Santa Bárbara	K11-C17
St. Dominic's Church	Iglesia de Santo Domingo	K11-C19
St. Laureano's Church	Iglesia de San Laureano	K9-C15
St. Lazarus Hill and Church	Loma e Iglesia de San Lázaro	San Lázaro Neighborhood
St. Claire Royal Convent	Convento de Santa Clara la Real	K11-C21
St. Francis Church	Iglesia de San Francisco	K10-21A
Cathedral Basilica of St. James the Apostle in Tunja	Catedral Basílica Metropolitana Santiago de Tunja	Bolivar Square
Meetinghouse of the Church of Jesus Christ of Latter-day Saints	La Iglesia de Jesucristo de los Santos de los Últimos Días	C12-K10
Our Lady of Miracles Church	Iglesia de Nuestra Señora del Milagro (El Topo)	K15-C19
St. Augustine Cloister	Claustro de San Agustín	K9-C23
Cojines del Zaque	Cojines del Zaque	K4-C12
Republic Forest	Bosque de la República	K11-C14
Freedom Obelisk	Obelisco de la Libertad	K10-C14
City Founder Gonzalo Suárez Rendón House and Museum	Casa Museo del Fundador	Bolívar Square
Juan de Castellanos' Palace and Museum	Casa Museo Juan de Castellanos	Bolívar Square
Don Juan de Vargas' Palace and Museum	Casa Museo Don Juan de Vargas	K9-C20
Bolivar Square	Plaza de Bolívar	K9-C19
Tower Palace (Governorate Palace of Boyacá)	Palacio de la Torre	Bolívar Square K10-C20
Rojas Pinilla's House	Casa Cultural Rojas Pinilla	K11-C16
Martyr's Wall Monument	Paredón de los Mártires	K9-C14
La Pila del Mono's Fountain	La Pila del Mono	K9-C20
Royal Palace (currently a shopping mall)	Plaza Real	K14-C20
St. Thomas University Building	Edificio Universidad Santo Tomás	K12-C19
Santander Park	Parque Santander	A Colón
Pinzón Park	Parque Pinzón	K8-C23
Maldonado Park	Parque Maldonado	C10-C30
La Esperanza Park	Parque La Esperanza	
Hoyo del Trigo Park	Parque Hoyo del Trigo	C22-K12

Northern Sector

English name	Spanish name	Address
St. Agnes' Church	Iglesia de Santa Inés	C42-A Norte
Hunzahúa Well	Pozo de Hunzahúa	A Norte, UPTC
Indigenous Race Monument	Monumento a la raza indígena	La Glorieta
Campus of the Uptc and its natural reserve	Campus de la Uptc y su reserva natural	A Norte, UPTC
Museum of Natural History	Museo de Historia Natural	A Norte, UPTC
Museum of Anthropology	Museo de Antropología	A Norte, UPTC
The Independence Stadium	Estadio de La Independencia	A Olímpica
Olympic Village	Villa Olímpica	A Olímpica

=== Festivals ===
- International Festival of Culture
- Holy Week (Semana Santa)
- Aguinaldo Boyacense

== Shopping ==
=== Downtown ===
Main places of interest are:

- El Cid
- El Virrey
- Teatro Boyacá
- Cinema Boyacá

=== Shopping malls ===
Unicentro is a shopping center that features a Jumbo and a Cinemark Theatres among many other stores.

Viva, a brand of Shopping Centers of Grupo Éxito.

=== Traditional markets ===
- Plaza de Mercado del Norte
- Plaza de Mercado del Sur

== Education ==
Relative to its small size, Tunja has been important in providing education. A large part of its population are students between high school and university.

Tunja has a considerable number of colleges, among these is the College of Boyacá, the first public school in the territories of Venezuela, Ecuador, Panama and Colombia, established when these countries were part of Gran Colombia. It was founded on 20 October 1822 by Vice President Francisco de Paula Santander. Among the most important schools are:

- Colegio de Boyacá
- Institucion Educativa San Jeronimo Emiliani
- Colegio Salesiano Maldonado
- Colegio INEM Carlos Arturo Torres
- Colegio de la Presentación
- Gimnasio Campestre del Norte.
- Colegio Municipal Silvino Rodríguez
- Escuela Normal Superior Santiago de Tunja.
- Escuela Normal Femenina "Leonor Álvarez Pinzón"
- Colegio Los Angeles
- Colegio Militar Juan José Rondón
- Colegio de Nuestra Señora del Rosario
- Colegio Gustavo Rojas Pinilla
- Colegio Andino
- Colegio American School Saint Frances
- Country Bilingual School

=== Universities ===
Tunja's major university, the Pedagogical and Technological University of Colombia (Uptc), was founded by General Gustavo Rojas Pinilla, and is one of the public universities in Colombia.

Other universities are:

- University of Boyaca
- Universidad Santo Tomás
- Escuela Superior de Administración Pública E.S.A.P.
- Universidad Nacional Abierta y a Distancia (UNAD)
- Fundacion Universitaria Juan de Castellanos
- Corporación Universitaria Remington (CUR-Cread Boyacá)
- Universidad Antonio Nariño
- Universidad Pontificia Bolivariana de Colombia
- Instituto Universitario de la Música y las Artes

== Sports ==
The city has two professional football teams: Boyacá Chico and Patriotas F.C. The teams play in the Colombian Professional Football A league. They play their games at La Independencia Stadium in the north of the city.

The stadium was rebuilt for the Copa Libertadores 2009, expanding capacity to 20,630 spectators and meeting FIFA specifications. The city organized the 2008 South American U-20 Futsal Cup in which Brazil was awarded as the championship. Colombia secured the fourth position in the tournament.

The city has a professional basketball team called Patriotas that plays in the Saludcoop Invitational Cup. This team plays its matches in the Municipality Colosseum that has a capacity of up to 5,000 spectators.

== Notable people ==
- Jair Bernal, former professional cyclist
- Iván Casas, professional cyclist
- Francisca Josefa de la Concepción, Criollo nun
- Pedro Antonio Herrera, professional cyclist
- José Ibáñez, former professional cyclist
- Diego Molano Vega, politician
- Gustavo Nieto Roa, film director
- Juan Carlos Pinzón, ambassador of Colombia to the United States
- Gustavo Rojas Pinilla, former president of Colombia
- Diego de Torres y Moyachoque, 16th century mestizo cacique of Turmequé

== Sister cities ==
- Brazil: São Paulo
- Ecuador: Guayaquil
- Finland: Jyväskylä
- Ireland: Dublin
- Italy: Catania
- Italy: Potenza (2009)
- Mexico: Tapachula
- Peru: Juliaca
- Spain: Cádiz
- Spain: Málaga (2013)
- Spain: Sevilla
- Spain: Toledo (2013)
- Colombia: Pamplona (2012)
- Colombia: Popayán (2012)
- Colombia: San Juan de Pasto
- Colombia: Valledupar
