= Aquiminzaque =

Tribal ruler

Quiminza
- hoa
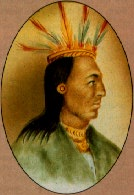
- Aquiminzaque, the last ruler of Hunza
- Reign: 1537–1540
- Predecessor: Eucaneme
- Successor: Position abolished
- Born: unknown Muisca Confederation
- Died: 1540; Hunza, New Kingdom of Granada
- Chibcha: Quiminza
- Dynasty: Hunza

Aquiminzaque (Chibcha: Aquim ó Quiminza, died Tunja, 1540) was the last hoa of Hunza, on which the Spanish city of Tunja (in present-day Colombia) was built, reigning from 1537 until his death. His psihipqua counterpart in the southern area of the Muisca was Sagipa. Aquiminzaque was for the Muisca what Túpac Amaru was for the Inca; and as the Inca leader, Quiminza was executed by decapitation.

== Biography ==
Aquiminzaque was the nephew of his predecessor, Eucaneme. Aquiminzaque‘s reign began on August 2, 1537, when Eucaneme was taken prisoner to Suesca by the Spanish.

Aquiminzaque ruled over the northern area of the Muisca in present-day Boyacá, Colombia in the years when the Spanish conquistadores were entering the highlands of the Muisca.

At first Aquiminzaque converted to Catholicism, but when he realized the true motives of the Spanish conquerors over the Muisca people, he revolted against them, undermining the initial rule of Hernán Pérez de Quesada, brother of Gonzalo Jiménez de Quesada. Shortly after, in 1540, Hernán executed Aquiminzaque by public decapitation in Tunja. The spectacle, meant as an example, was watched by the Muisca people and executions of other caciques of Toca, Motavita, Samacá, Turmequé and Sutamarchán followed.

The death of the last hoa meant the end of the Muisca Confederation.

=== Legacy ===
In Tunja, the capital of the Boyacá department, a statue honouring Aquiminzaque (Monumento a la Raza Indígena) has been erected.

=== Aquiminzaque in Muisca history ===
History of the Muisca
Altiplano	Muisca	Art	Architecture	Astronomy	Cuisine	El Dorado	Subsistence	Women	Conquest

== See also ==
- Spanish conquest of the Muisca
- Muisca rulers, history of Colombia
