= University of Boyacá =

Universidad de Boyacá
- Universidad de Boyacá
- Motto: "Inspirados en el poder del saber, formar hombres y mujeres libres críticos y comprometidos socialmente"
- Type: Private
- Established: September 22, 1979
- Location: Tunja, Boyacá, Colombia
- Nickname: Uniboyaca
- Website: www.uniboyaca.edu.co

The University of Boyacá is a private university based in the city of Tunja, Boyacá, Colombia.

== History ==
Boyacá University was founded in the city of Tunja on September 22, 1979, by a native Guateque scholar, Dr. Osmar Correal Cabral, and Dr. Rosita Payeras Cuervo, an economist from Bogotá.

The first headquarters was located in the traditional Passage Vargas as "Higher Education Corporation of Boyacá" which later was transferred to the headquarters of Santander Park, where two technological programs are consolidated.

In 1983 the Institute concentrated its headquarters in the Santo Domingo Senate, which offered more than ten undergraduate academics and two postgraduate academics.

In 1993, after a change in its legal nature, the institution obtained the status of " University of Boyacá". Following that same year, directives began the construction of the first own building on the central campus.

Once the institution fulfilled all the requirements and demands of the Ministry of Education concerning the change of character, on September 16, 2004, university recognition is done by Decree 2910 of the Office of the Minister of National Education.

Currently, the university campus in Tunja has 25,174 sqm of built area, consisting of three buildings for classrooms, a small square building, and two buildings of multiple resources where the science and engineering laboratories are located. Also found in this area are a central academic and administrative building, a biological sciences building, laboratories, and workshops on Fashion Design, Mechatronics Engineering, Industrial Engineering, and Psychology. The institution has 3 auditoriums each with a capacity for 512 people, 350 people, and 300 people. At the beginning of 2013, an administrative building with an area of 2000 sqm was inaugurated.

Additional buildings on the campus are also an academic agora, a central square, and a sports area comprising two multiple courts. This space is complemented by a Coliseum with a capacity of 1,000 people; it has a multipurpose court, gym, and aerobics room. In 2011, the university inaugurates a sports campus with more than 36,000 m^{2}, designed for the practice of sports such as tennis, football, volleyball, basketball, microfutbol, and athleticism, among others.

In 2011 the university extended its academic coverage in the department of Boyaca, adding new headquarters for the programs of Law and Political Sciences, Environmental Engineering and Architecture, Psychology Specialization in Project Management in the town of Sogamoso as well as in Chiquinquirá with the programs of Law and Political Science and Administration and International Business.

The university offers 20 undergraduate professional programs, 19 graduate programs, and the Master of Urban Planning accredited by the Ministry of Education. In addition, 339 cooperation agreements have been signed for joint projects, exchange, and permanent mobility of teachers, students, and researchers.

== See also ==
- List of universities in Colombia
