= Tequendama (disambiguation) =

Tequendama may refer to:

- Tequendama, archaeological site in Cundinamarca, one of the oldest in Colombia
- Tequendama Falls, a waterfall close to this site
- Tequendama Falls Museum, the museum at the waterfall
- Tequendama mine, emerald mine in the Western Emerald Belt, Boyacá
- Tequendama Province, a province of the department of Cundinamarca
- San Antonio del Tequendama, a municipality in the Tequendama Province
- Hotel Tequendama, a hotel in the Colombian capital Bogotá
