= Ramiriquí =

Coordinates: 5°24′N 73°20′W

- Municipality and town
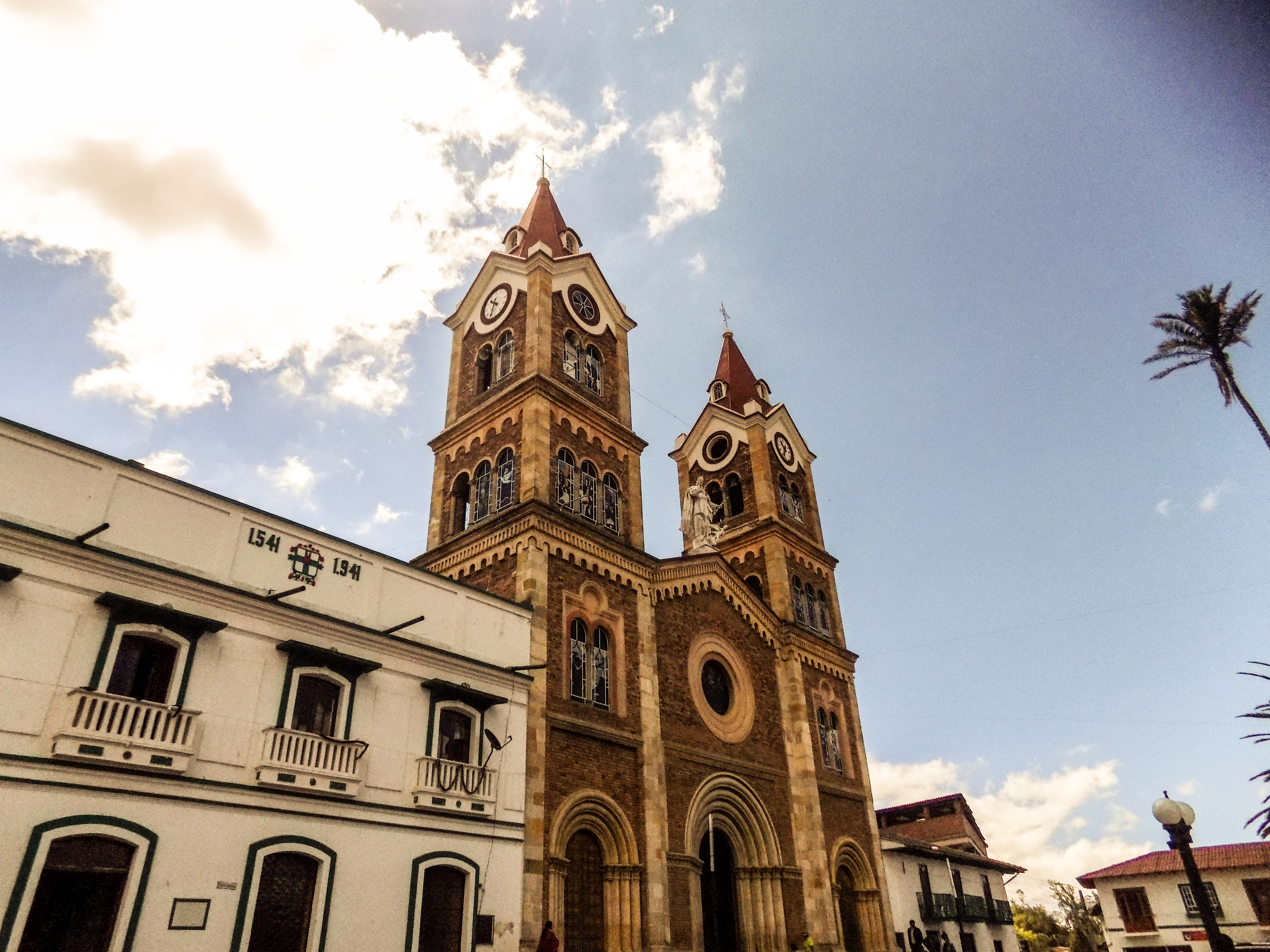
- Church of Ramiriquí

- Flag

- Location of the municipality and town of Ramiriquí in the Boyacá department of Colombia
- Country: Colombia
- Department: Boyacá Department
- Province: Márquez Province
- Founded: 21 December 1541
- Founder: Pedro Durán

Government
  - Mayor: José Moisés Aguirre Sanabria (2020–2023)

Area
  - Municipality and town: 146.5 km^{2} (56.6 sq mi)
  - Urban: 7.25 km^{2} (2.80 sq mi)
- Elevation: 2,325 m (7,628 ft)

Population (2015)
  - Municipality and town: 10,015
  - Density: 68.36/km^{2} (177.1/sq mi)
  - Urban: 5,023
- Time zone: UTC-5 (Colombia Standard Time)
- Website: Official website

Ramiriquí is a town and municipality in the Colombian Department of Boyacá, part of the subregion of the Márquez Province. Ramiriquí borders the department capital Tunja in the north, in the south Chinavita and Zetaquirá, in the east Rondón and Ciénaga and in the west Chivatá, Tibaná and Jenesano.

== Etymology ==
Ramiriquí was named after the last cacique; Ramirique. In the Chibcha language of the Muisca Ramirraquí means "white earth". An alternative etymology is Ca-mi-quiquí which means "our strength over the grasslands".

== History ==
The area of Ramiriquí was inhabited by the Muisca before the arrival of the Spanish conquistadors on the Altiplano Cundiboyacense in the 1530s. The northern Muisca Confederation was ruled from nearby Hunza, present-day Tunja, after the mythological and brutal cacique Goranchacha moved the capital there from Ramiriquí. The first ruler of Hunza was Hunzahúa after whom the city was named.

Second-last ruler Quemuenchatocha died in Ramiriquí, after he was beaten by Spanish conquistador Gonzalo Jiménez de Quesada.

The modern town was founded on December 21, 1541 by Spanish friar Pedro Durán.

Within the boundaries of Ramiriquí petroglyphs have been found.

== Economy ==
Main economical activities in Ramiriquí are agriculture (uchuva, tree tomatoes, cucumbers, beans, blackberries and maize), fishing and crafts.

== Born in Ramiriqui ==
- Jose Ignacio de Marquez, first civil Colombian president
- José Patrocinio Jiménez, former professional cyclist
- Mauricio Soler, former international cyclist

== Climate ==
Climate data for Ramiriquí (Villa Luisa), elevation 2,200 m (7,200 ft), (1981–2010)
Month	Jan	Feb	Mar	Apr	May	Jun	Jul	Aug	Sep	Oct	Nov	Dec	Year
Mean daily maximum °C (°F)	23.2 (73.8)	23.6 (74.5)	23.3 (73.9)	22.5 (72.5)	21.7 (71.1)	20.8 (69.4)	20.3 (68.5)	19.8 (67.6)	21.2 (70.2)	21.9 (71.4)	22.3 (72.1)	22.7 (72.9)	21.9 (71.4)
Daily mean °C (°F)	16.7 (62.1)	17.0 (62.6)	17.3 (63.1)	17.1 (62.8)	16.8 (62.2)	16.1 (61.0)	15.6 (60.1)	15.6 (60.1)	16.0 (60.8)	16.5 (61.7)	16.7 (62.1)	16.7 (62.1)	16.5 (61.7)
Mean daily minimum °C (°F)	10.6 (51.1)	11.1 (52.0)	12.0 (53.6)	12.6 (54.7)	12.7 (54.9)	12.2 (54.0)	11.9 (53.4)	11.7 (53.1)	11.3 (52.3)	11.7 (53.1)	12.1 (53.8)	11.5 (52.7)	11.8 (53.2)
Average precipitation mm (inches)	19.5 (0.77)	33.6 (1.32)	55.9 (2.20)	95.1 (3.74)	129.0 (5.08)	110.0 (4.33)	115.4 (4.54)	95.8 (3.77)	77.5 (3.05)	112.0 (4.41)	92.7 (3.65)	40.1 (1.58)	976.4 (38.44)
Average precipitation days (≥ 1.0 mm)	6	9	13	19	23	24	26	24	19	20	17	10	204
Average relative humidity (%)	78	76	77	80	82	84	85	85	82	81	82	80	81
Source: Instituto de Hidrologia Meteorologia y Estudios Ambientales

== Gallery ==
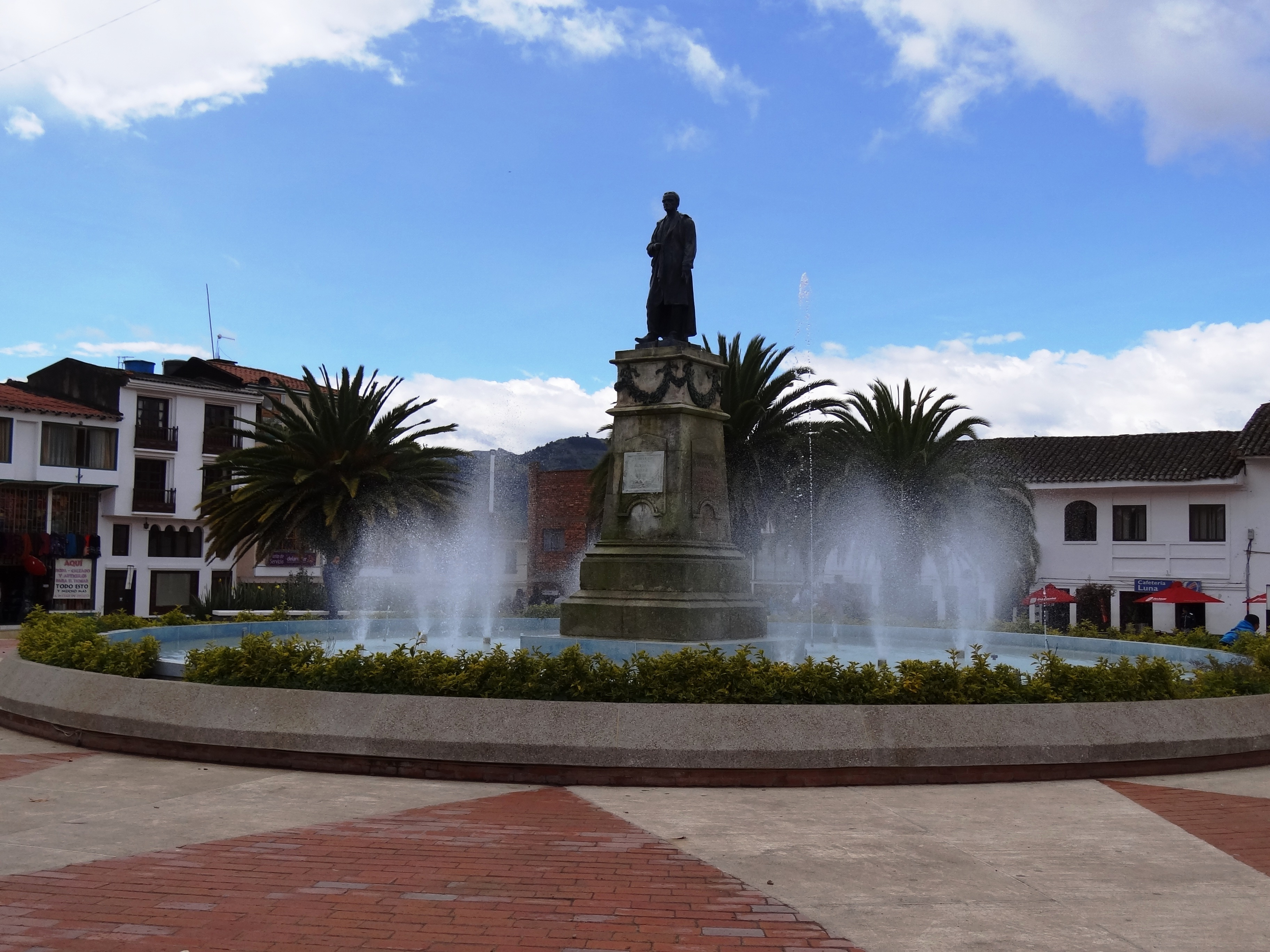
Central square

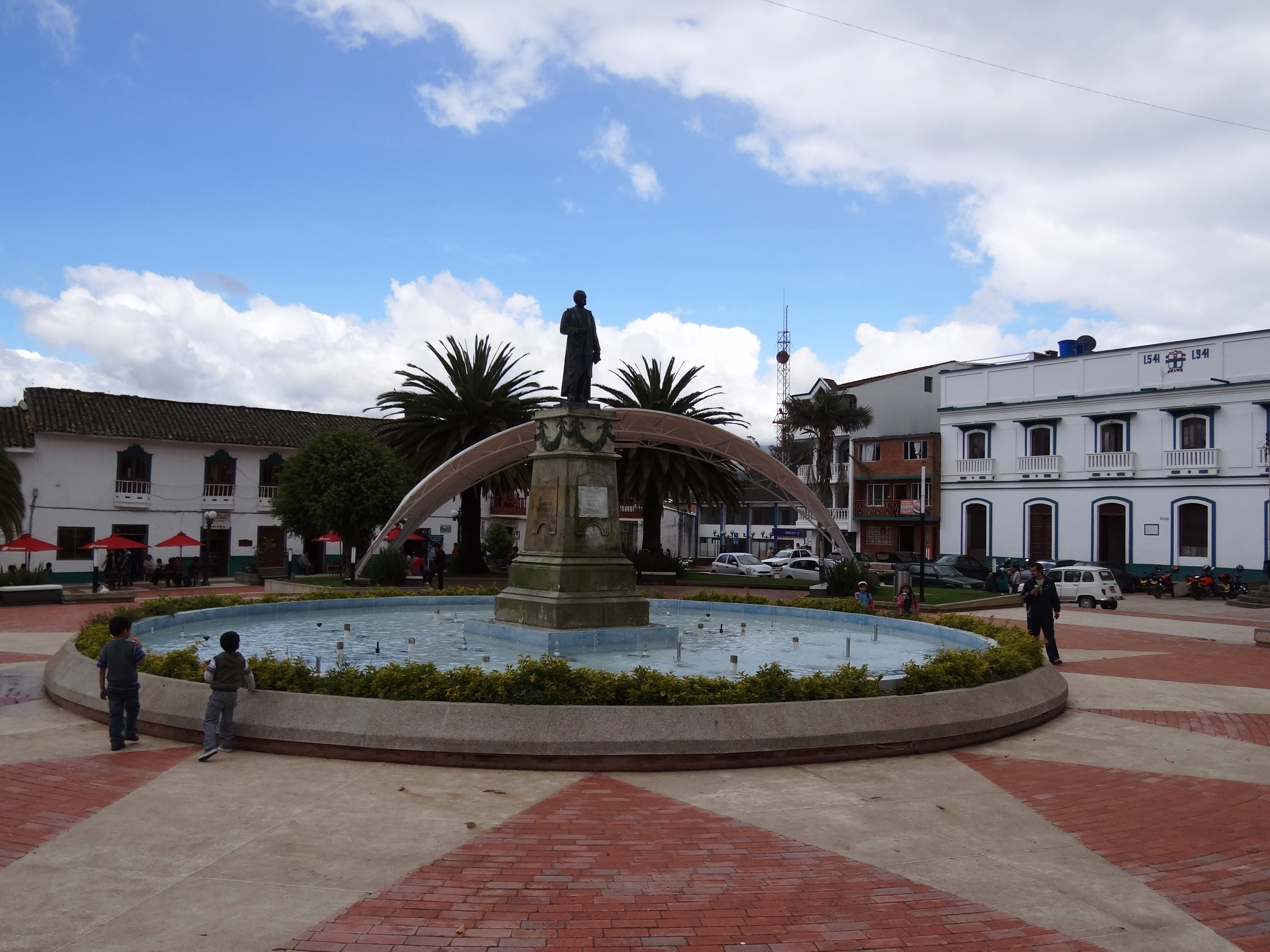
Central square

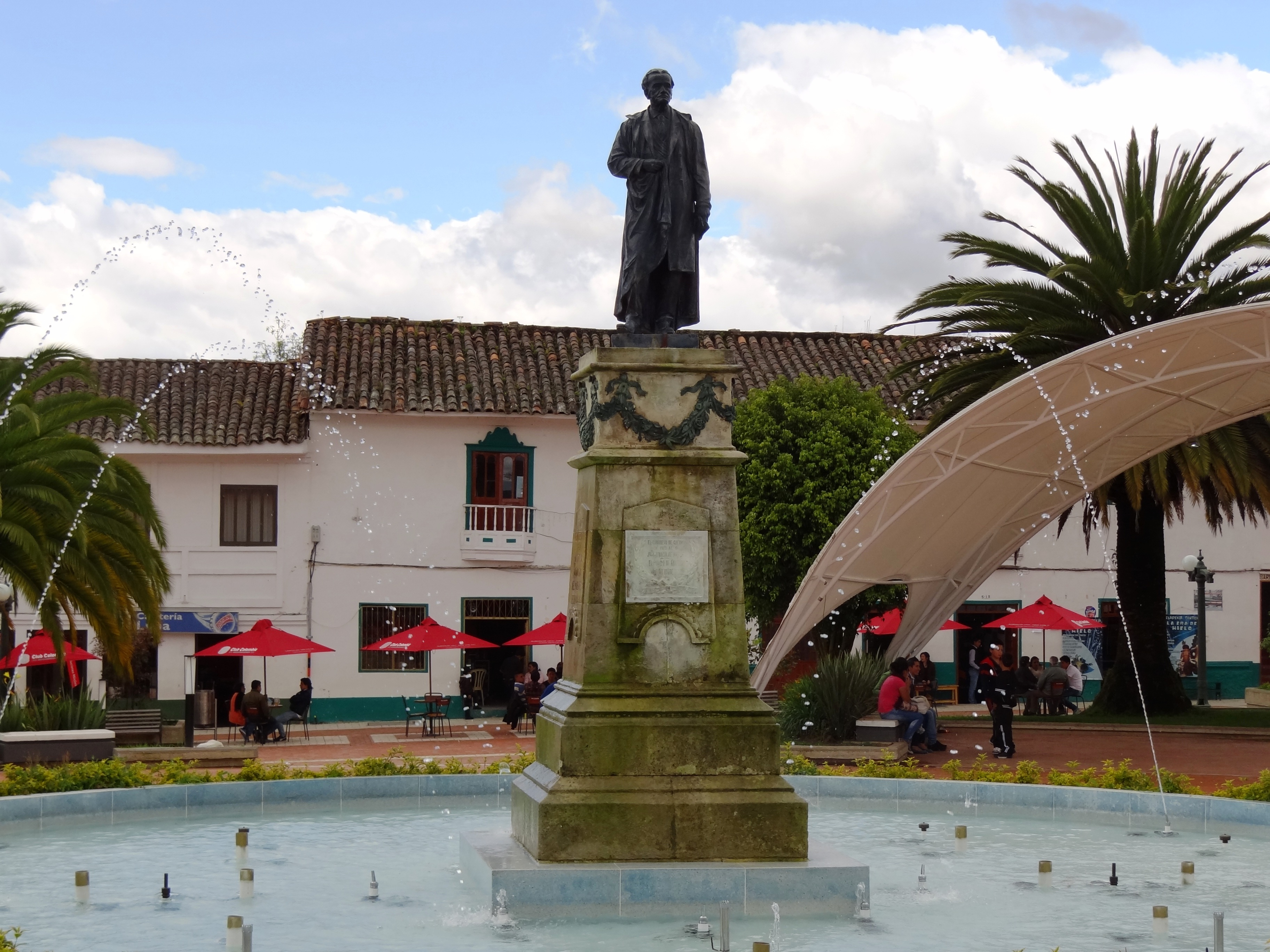
Central square
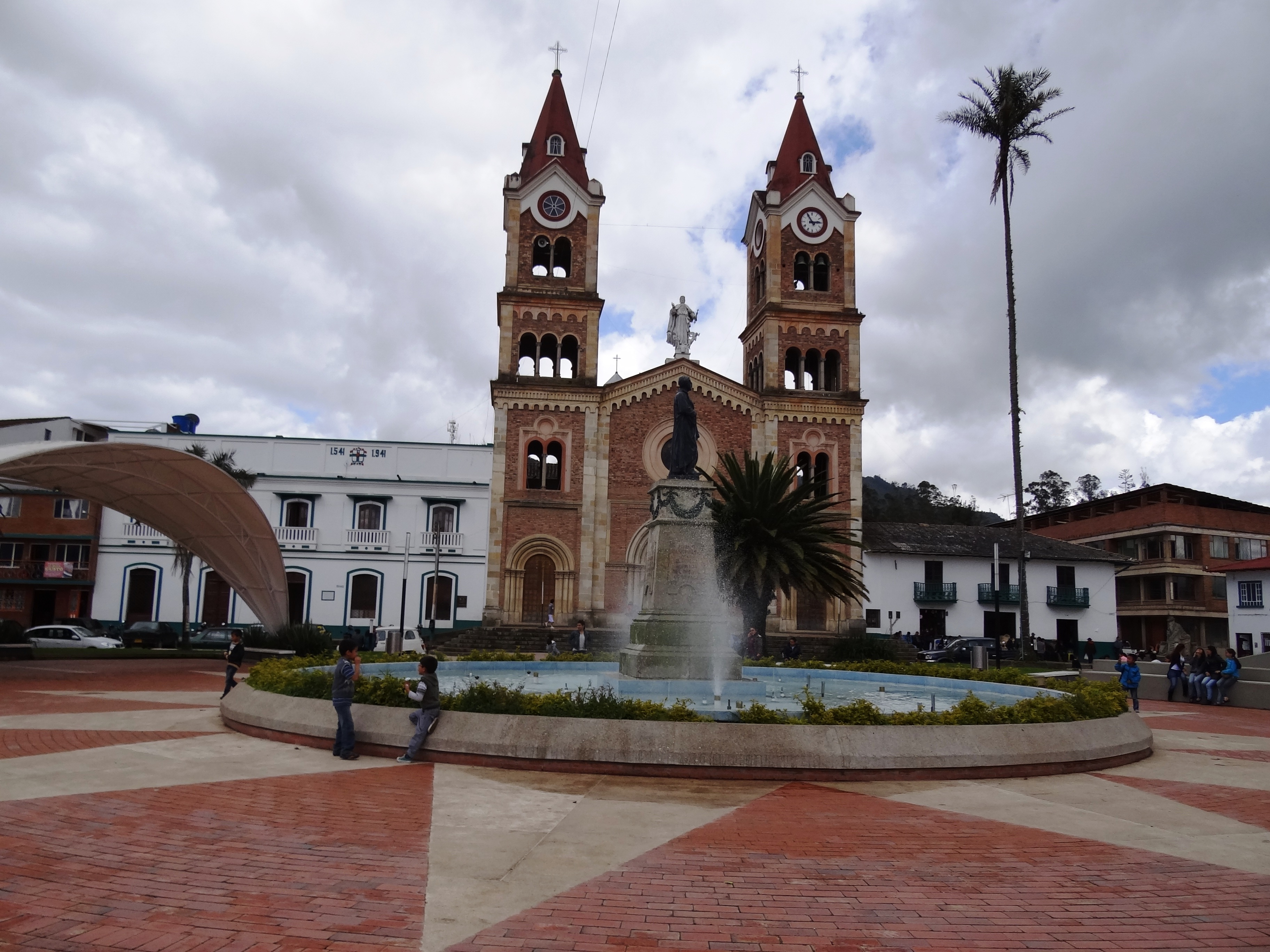
Central square and church

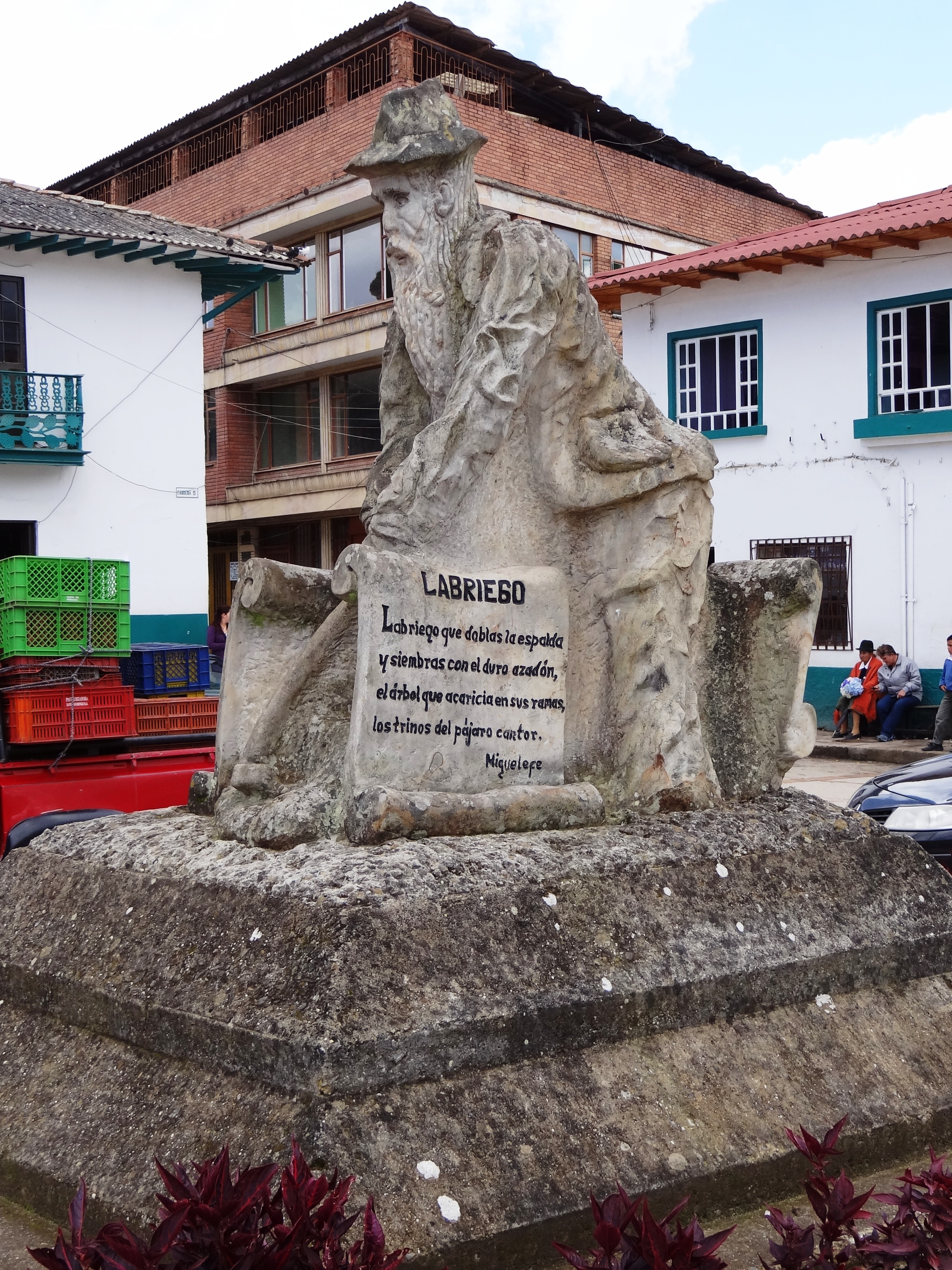
Farmer monument
