= Cojines del Zaque =

Archeological site in Colombia

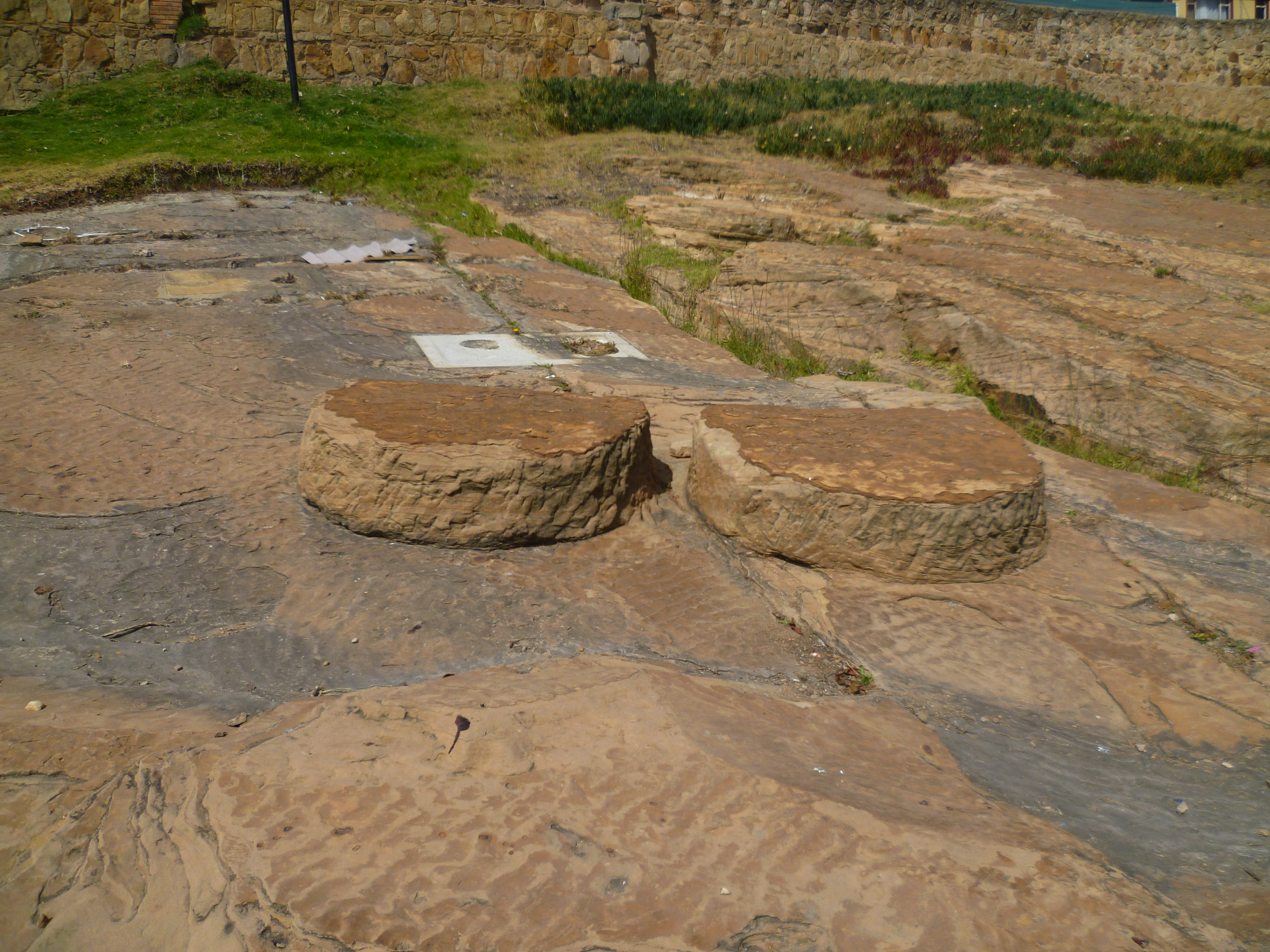
- Cojines del Zaque in 2015

- Location within Colombia
- 5°32′17.37″N 73°22′9.88″W
- Type: Ritual site
- Periods: Late Muisca
- Cultures: Muisca
- Satellite of: Hunza
- Location: Tunja, Boyacá
- Region: Altiplano Cundiboyacense, Colombia
- Part of: Historical Park Cojines del Zaque; Muisca sites

History
- Abandoned: Spanish conquest

Site notes
- Material: Sandstone
- Elevation: 2,834 m (9,298 ft)
- Diameter: 1.1 m (3.6 ft)
- Public access: Yes

The Cojines del Zaque (English: "Cushions of the Zaque") is an archeological site of the Muisca located in the city of Tunja, Boyacá, which in the time of the Muisca Confederation was called Hunza. The cojines are two round stones used in the religion of the Muisca to worship Sun god Sué and his wife; Moon goddess Chía. When the Spanish conquistadores arrived, they called them Cojines del Diablo.

== Background ==
During the time before the Spanish conquest of the Muisca, the central highlands of the Colombian Andes (Altiplano Cundiboyacense) were populated by the Muisca. This advanced civilization had its own religion and rituals, centred around the most important deities Sué and Chía. The northern territories were ruled by the iraca of Sugamuxi, the tundama of Tundama, and the zaque based in Hunza.

== Description ==
The Cojines are two circular stones made of sandstone located at the base of the San Lázaro hill in Tunja. The northernmost Cojín measures 1.1 metres (3.6 ft) in diameter and the southern pillow 1 metre (3.3 ft). The stones are oriented concerning the solar ecliptic and consist of an inclined part in the west and a flat part in the east. The rocks were used by the zaque to kneel and pray to Sué at sunrise.

The Cojines were studied as of 1847 and in 1928 the city of Tunja made the stones into an archeological site.

=== Rituals and festivities ===
Every morning the zaque would go in a procession from his grand bohío in Hunza to the Cojines. Apart from the daily rituals, also with sowing and harvests, rituals were performed on the Cojines del Zaque.

The Muisca calendar defined the months of sowing and harvests and those periods would fall on the Gregorian calendar in the months of March and September respectively. To increase the fertility of the lands the Muisca had their agriculture, they performed festivities to the gods around the Cojines del Zaque. During these festivals, the Muisca danced in groups, holding hands and sang to the music of flutes, ocarinas and other instruments. They danced on the rhythm of drums. During these rituals the Muisca got drunk by drinking their typical chicha.

Sometimes twelve twelve-year-old boys; moxas, captured from other indigenous peoples in the region would be sacrificed to the gods at the site of the Cojines del Zaque. The heads of the boys would be placed on the cojines and the children decapitated draining the Cojines in blood. The Muisca left their bodies lying there as food for Sué. The bodies would be retrieved after a few days.

== See also ==
- Sun Temple (Sogamoso)
- Muisca religion, mythology
- Piedras del Tunjo
- Pacanchique
