= Quemuenchatocha =

Tribal ruler

- hoa
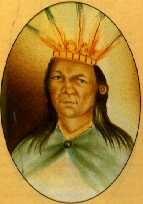
- Quemuenchatocha, ruler of Hunza
- Reign: 1490–1537
- Predecessor: Michuá
- Successor: Quiminza
- Born: c. 1472; Hunza, Muisca Confederation
- Died: 1538 (aged 65–66); Ramiriquí, New Kingdom of Granada
- Issue: Quimuinza (nephew)
- Chibcha: Quimuinchateca
- Dynasty: Hunza

Quemuenchatocha or Quimuinchateca (named in the earliest sources Eucaneme) (Hunza, 1472–Ramiriquí, 1538) was the second-last hoa of Hunza, currently known as Tunja, as of 1490. He was the ruler of the northern Muisca when the Spanish conquistadores arrived in the Muisca highlands. His contemporary enemy psihipquas of the southern Muisca were successively Nemequene and Bogotá.

== Biography ==
Eucaneme was eighteen years old when he accessed the throne, succeeding his predecessor Michuá as ruler of the northern Muisca. His reign was cruel and under his tyranny the Muisca feared him. His rule was so brutal that when the Spanish conquistadors entered the outskirts of the capital Hunza and found a hill with poles where bodies were dangling, they named it Cerro de la Horca ("Gallows Hill").

Both his predecessor Michuá and their eternal enemies, the southern Muisca led by psihipqua Saguamanchica died in the Battle of Chocontá in 1490. Eucaneme succeeded the throne for the northern Muisca based in Hunza while Nemequene accessed for the southern Muisca, ruled from Muyquytá. To halt the northern expansion politics of their southern enemies, Quemuenchatocha sought the help of the caciques of Gámeza, Sugamuxi, Tundama, and Sáchica. In 1514 to prevent blood loss Eucaneme proposed to fight only man-to-man battles. This idea didn't work out and the southern zipa Nemequene, while having won the battle of the Arroyo de las Vueltas, was fatally hurt. The southern troops retreated and installed the new ruler Tisquesusa. The iraca, Sugamuxi, negotiated a truce between the northern and southern factions of the Muisca which held until the arrival of the Spanish in 1537.

Upon the advancement of the Spaniards instead of fighting them, he tried to please them with gifts while hiding the rich treasures of the Muisca, famous for their trade in emeralds and vast quantities of gold. He forbade his people to show the upcoming Spanish conquerors the way to his fortress and installed harsh penalties for doing so.

The strategy did not work out. On August 20, 1537, the Spanish conquistadors led by Gonzalo Jiménez de Quesada found Eucaneme sitting on this throne decorated with gold, emeralds, and precious cloths and he was taken prisoner and deported to Suesca. This happened where today the Convento de San Agustín is located. Eucaneme fled to the village of Ramiriquí where he shortly afterwards died. Following the Muisca rules of inheritance, his nephew Quiminza succeeded to the throne as last ruler of Muisca before the New Granada viceroyalty of Spain in northern South America was established.

While not named as Quemuenchatocha, the defeat of the hoa of Hunza is described in the work of uncertain authorship about the conquest; Epítome de la conquista del Nuevo Reino de Granada.

In Tunja, capital of the Boyacá department, a statue honoring Quemuenchatocha and his successor Aquiminzaque (Monumento a la Raza Indígena) has been erected.

=== Quemuenchatocha in Muisca history ===
History of the Muisca
Altiplano	Muisca	Art	Architecture	Astronomy	Cuisine	El Dorado	Subsistence	Women	Conquest

== See also ==
- Muisca rulers
- Pacanchique
- Spanish conquest of the Muisca
- History of Colombia
- El Dorado

== Bibliography ==
- "Epítome de la conquista del Nuevo Reino de Granada", Boletín Cultural y Bibliográfico, 16 (3), Banco de la República: 81–97, 1979 [1889 (1539)]
