= Tegua people =

Tegua
Total population
- 0 (end 19th century)

Regions with significant populations
- Boyacá, Casanare Colombia

Languages
- Arawakan, Colombian Spanish

Religion
- Traditional religion, Catholicism

Related ethnic groups
- U'wa, Muisca, Achagua, Guayupe

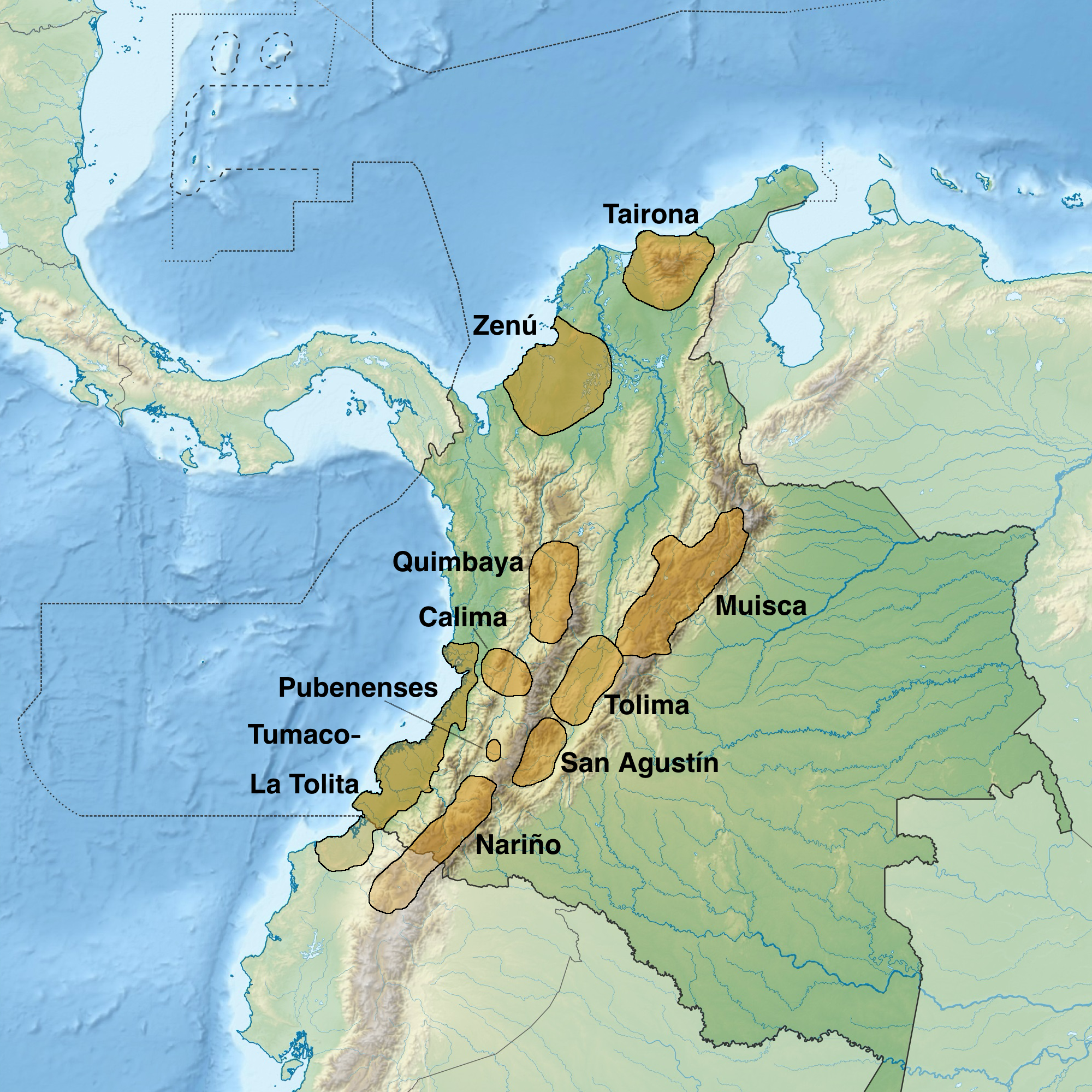
Map of pre-Columbian civilizations. The Tegua lived east of the Muisca

The Tegua or Tecua were an Arawak-speaking indigenous people of Colombia who died out in the 19th century.

The territories of the Tegua stretched from Macanal, Boyacá in the west to Aguazul in the east and from Berbeo in the north to Villanueva in the south, on the eastern flanks of the Eastern Ranges of the Colombian Andes.

Knowledge of the Tegua is scarce, but has been provided by pre-modern scholars Lucas Fernández de Piedrahita, Basilio Fernández de Oviedo and Pedro Simón and in modern times by Javier Ocampo López and Pedro Gustavo Huertas Ramírez.

== Etymology ==
The name of the people Tegua, originally meaning "boy", is presently a word in Colombian Spanish and means "shaman" or "witchdoctor", referring to the advanced knowledge the Tegua had of medicinal plants.

== Tegua territory ==
The Tegua inhabited the area of the lower and central Lengupá River valley in the Eastern Ranges of the Colombian Andes and the foothills (Piedemonte) towards the Llanos Orientales, such as the Casanare municipalities Recetor, Chámeza and Aguazul. To the south, the Guayupe were living, the eastern part was bordering the territories of the Achagua and the western and northern terrains were inhabited by the Muisca. The Tegua living east of Guatavita paid tribute to the Muisca. The origin of the Tegua people was in Campohermoso, Boyacá, where both the Lengupá and Upía Rivers flow.

=== Municipalities belonging to Tegua territories ===
Name	Department	Altitude (m) urban centre	Map
Campohermoso	Boyacá	1100	
Páez	Boyacá	1300	
Berbeo	Boyacá	1335	
Miraflores	Boyacá	1432	
Macanal (shared with Muisca)	Boyacá	1680	
San Luis de Gaceno	Boyacá	395	
Santa María	Boyacá	850	
Aguazul (shared with Achagua)	Casanare	290	
Recetor (shared with Achagua)	Casanare	800	
Chámeza (shared with Achagua)	Casanare	1150	
Sabanalarga	Casanare	450	
Villanueva	Casanare	420	

== Description ==
As noted by Pedro Simón, the Tegua had a diet formed by maize, honey, fish, coca and peanuts. They cultivated yuca and made pies of yuca and ants.

The chroniclers of the 17th century describe a Tegua woman with the assigned name La Cardeñosa, as a beautiful Tegua.

The first contact with the Tegua was made in 1538 by Juan de San Martín. In 1556 the evangelization process was started to convert the Tegua to Catholicism.

Names of Tegua caciques are reinstalled as street names of Campohermoso; Pirazica, Yayogua, Onayomba and Yapompo.

== Language ==
De Piedrahita has written that the Tegua spoke another language and looked different from the Muisca.

== See also ==
- Muisca
- U'wa
- Achagua, Guayupe
