= Aquitania, Boyacá =

Coordinates: 5°35′N 72°50′W

Aquitania
- Municipality and town
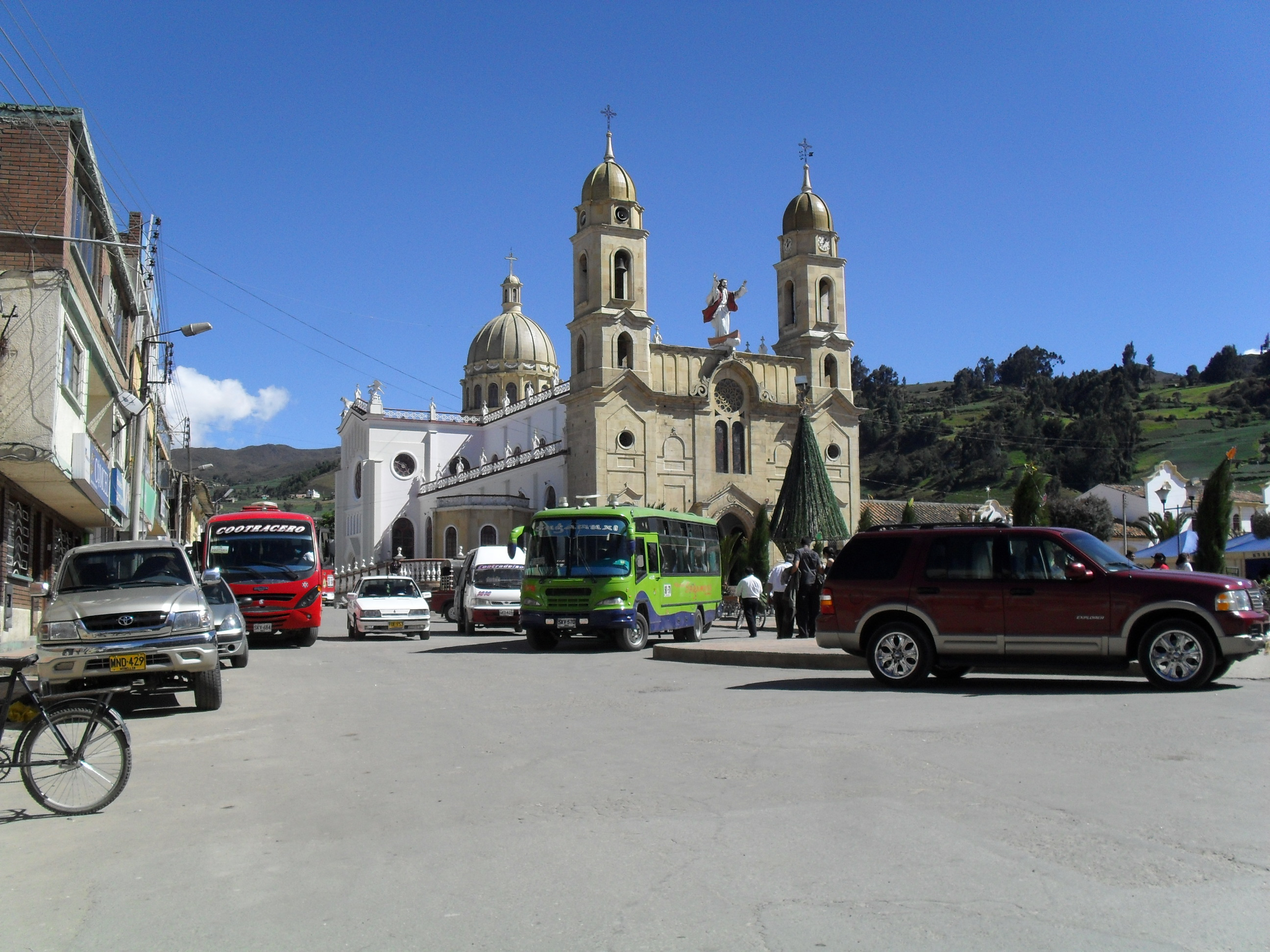
- Central square

- Flag Coat of arms

- Location of the municipality and town of Aquitania in the Boyacá Department of Colombia
- Country: Colombia
- Department: Boyacá Department
- Province: Sugamuxi Province
- Founded: 1777

Government
  - Mayor: Hector Orlando Barrera Cardenas (2020-2023)

Area
  - Municipality and town: 943 km^{2} (364 sq mi)
  - Urban: 0.52 km^{2} (0.20 sq mi)
- Elevation: 3,030 m (9,940 ft)

Population (2015)
  - Municipality and town: 15,241
  - Density: 16.2/km^{2} (41.9/sq mi)
  - Urban: 6,329
- Time zone: UTC-5 (Colombia Standard Time)
- Website: Official website

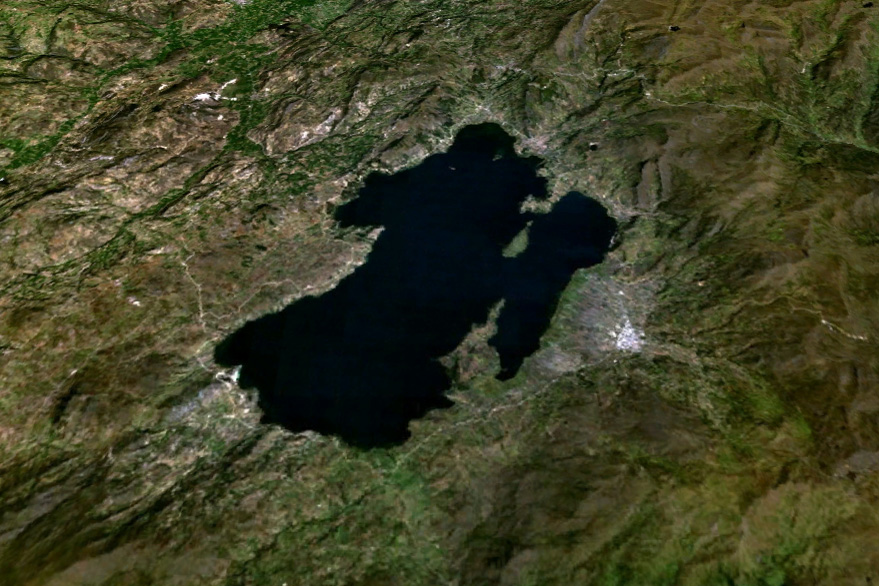
Satellite view of Lake Tota. Aquitania is the town on the right-hand side of the lake

Aquitania is a town and municipality in Boyacá Department, Colombia, part of the Sugamuxi Province, a subregion of Boyaca. Aquitania borders Sogamoso, Cuítiva and Mongua in the north, Zetaquirá, San Eduardo and Páez in the south, Labranzagrande, Pajarito, Recetor and Chámeza in the east and Cuítiva, Tota, Zetaquirá and San Eduardo in the west. The urban centre is situated on the Altiplano Cundiboyacense as one of the highest towns at an altitude of 3,030 metres (9,940 ft). The town of Aquitania borders Lake Tota to the east.

== Climate ==
Climate data for Aquitania/Lake Tota (Tunel El), elevation 3,000 m (9,800 ft), (1981–2010)
Month	Jan	Feb	Mar	Apr	May	Jun	Jul	Aug	Sep	Oct	Nov	Dec	Year
Mean daily maximum °C (°F)	16.9 (62.4)	16.8 (62.2)	17.0 (62.6)	16.3 (61.3)	15.8 (60.4)	14.9 (58.8)	14.5 (58.1)	14.5 (58.1)	15.2 (59.4)	15.7 (60.3)	16.1 (61.0)	16.6 (61.9)	15.8 (60.4)
Daily mean °C (°F)	11.6 (52.9)	11.7 (53.1)	11.8 (53.2)	11.8 (53.2)	11.8 (53.2)	11.4 (52.5)	10.9 (51.6)	10.9 (51.6)	11.2 (52.2)	11.4 (52.5)	11.6 (52.9)	11.8 (53.2)	11.5 (52.7)
Mean daily minimum °C (°F)	6.8 (44.2)	7.3 (45.1)	7.6 (45.7)	8.2 (46.8)	8.5 (47.3)	8.2 (46.8)	7.7 (45.9)	7.7 (45.9)	7.5 (45.5)	7.6 (45.7)	7.9 (46.2)	7.4 (45.3)	7.7 (45.9)
Average precipitation mm (inches)	17.1 (0.67)	30.4 (1.20)	57.2 (2.25)	95.7 (3.77)	87.8 (3.46)	70.1 (2.76)	77.9 (3.07)	58.8 (2.31)	62.5 (2.46)	87.2 (3.43)	81.4 (3.20)	23.9 (0.94)	749.9 (29.52)
Average precipitation days	4	6	11	15	18	18	20	18	16	16	14	8	159
Average relative humidity (%)	80	81	82	85	85	85	85	85	84	85	85	82	84
Mean monthly sunshine hours	241.8	183.5	167.4	132.0	139.5	129.0	139.5	130.2	132.0	145.7	156.0	213.9	1,910.5
Mean daily sunshine hours	7.8	6.5	5.4	4.4	4.5	4.3	4.5	4.2	4.4	4.7	5.2	6.9	5.2
Source: Instituto de Hidrologia Meteorologia y Estudios Ambientales

== History ==
Before the Spanish conquest of the Muisca, Aquitania was called "Guáquia" and was inhabited by the indigenous Muisca people. The area was ruled by the iraca of Sugamuxi. Conquistador Juan de San Martín reached the area in 1540. Modern Aquitania was founded in 1777.

== Economy ==
Commercial agricultural products grown in Aquitania include onions, peas, corn, and potatoes.

== Born in Aquitania ==
- Arsenio Chaparro Cardoso, former professional cyclist
- Freddy Montaña, professional cyclist

== Gallery ==
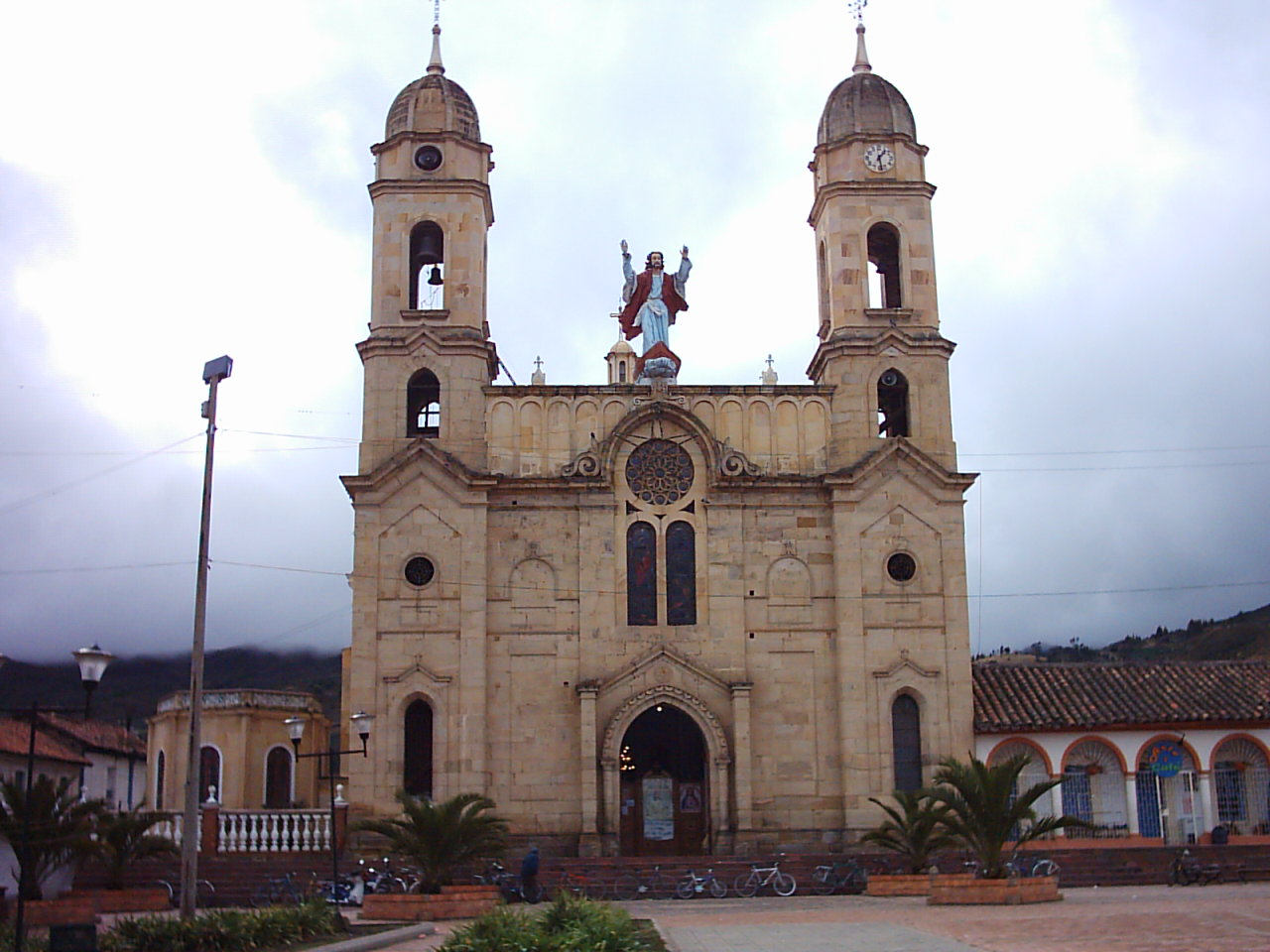
Church of Aquitania

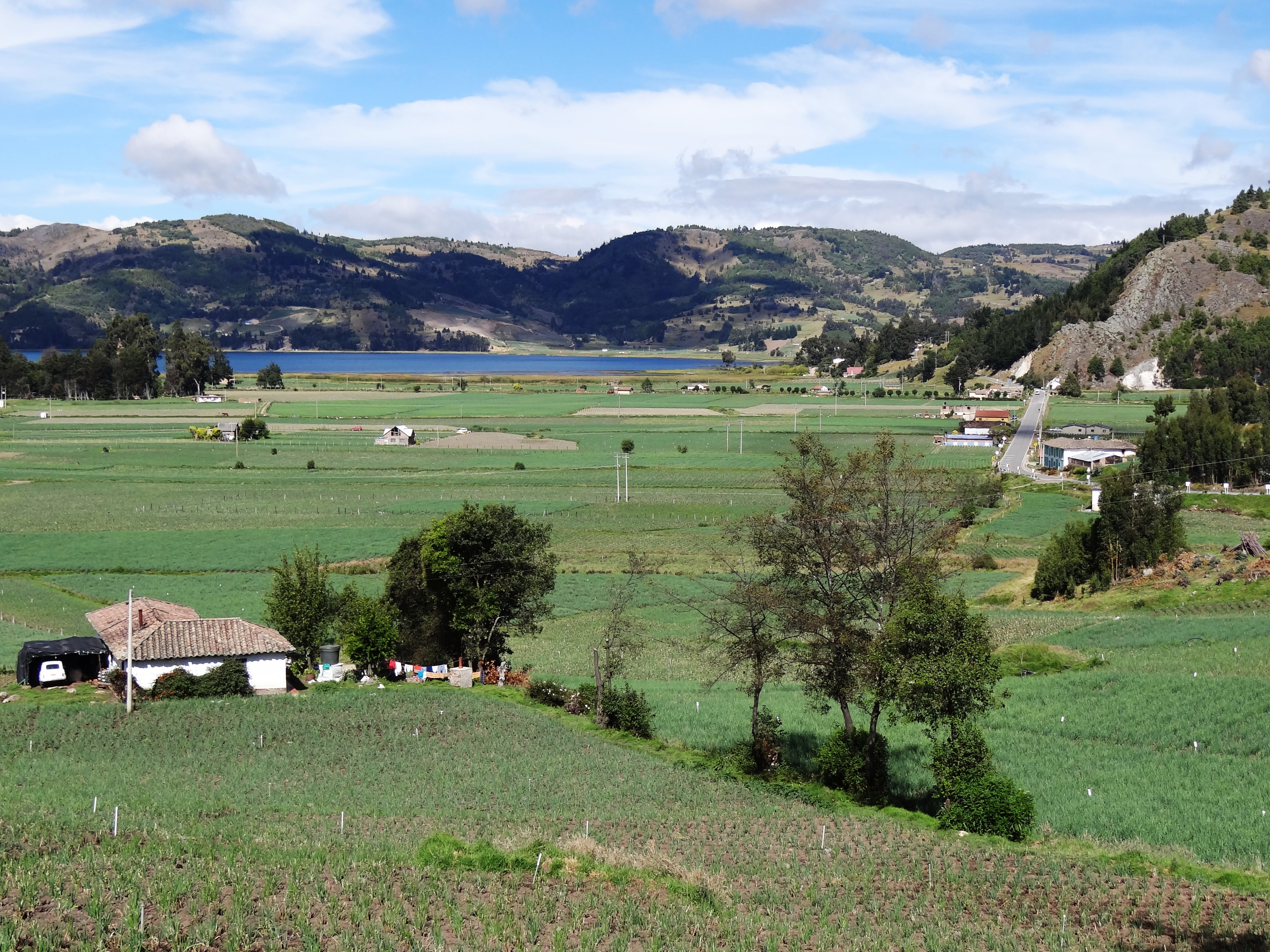
Onion fields in Aquitania

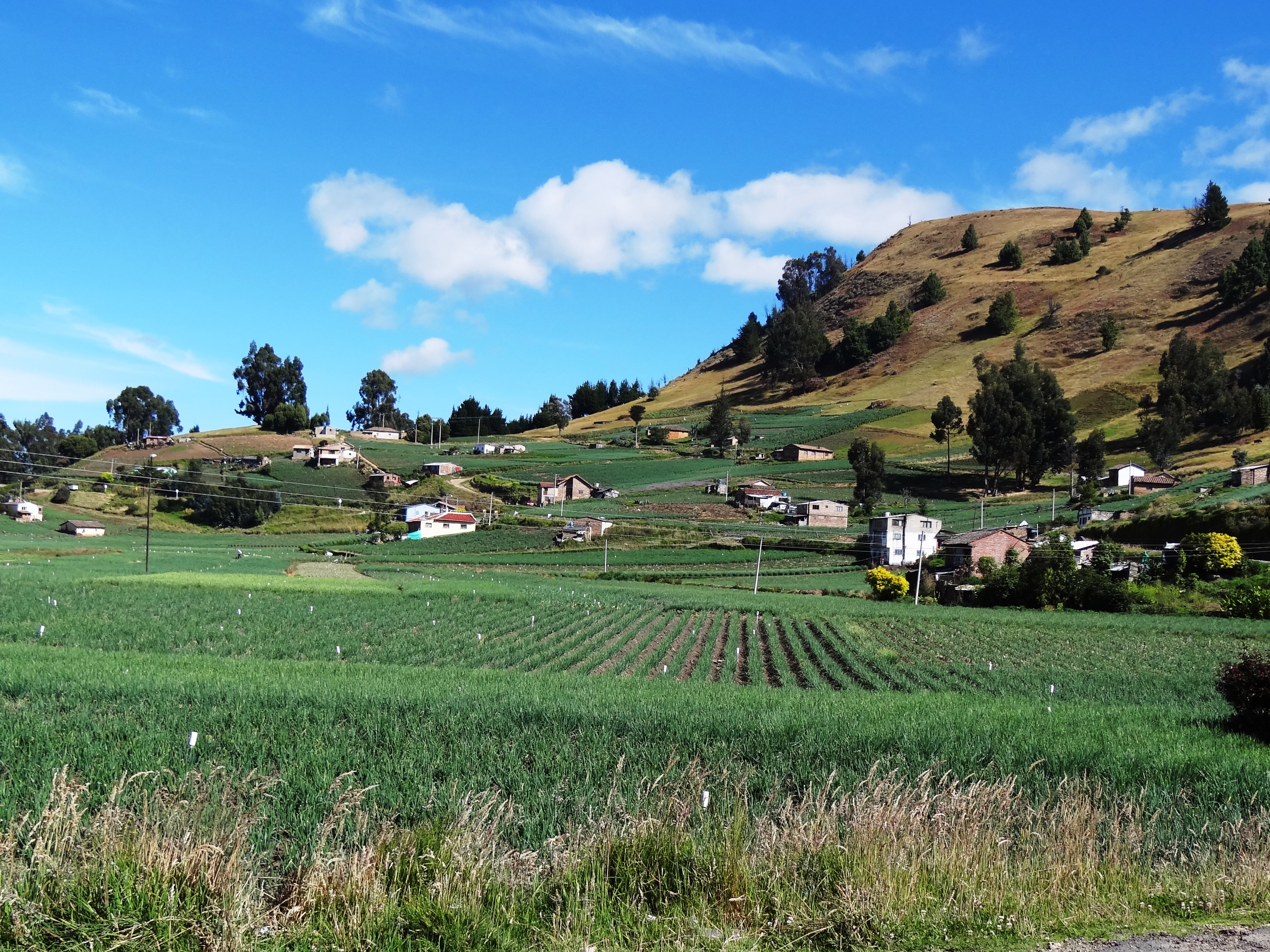
Onion fields

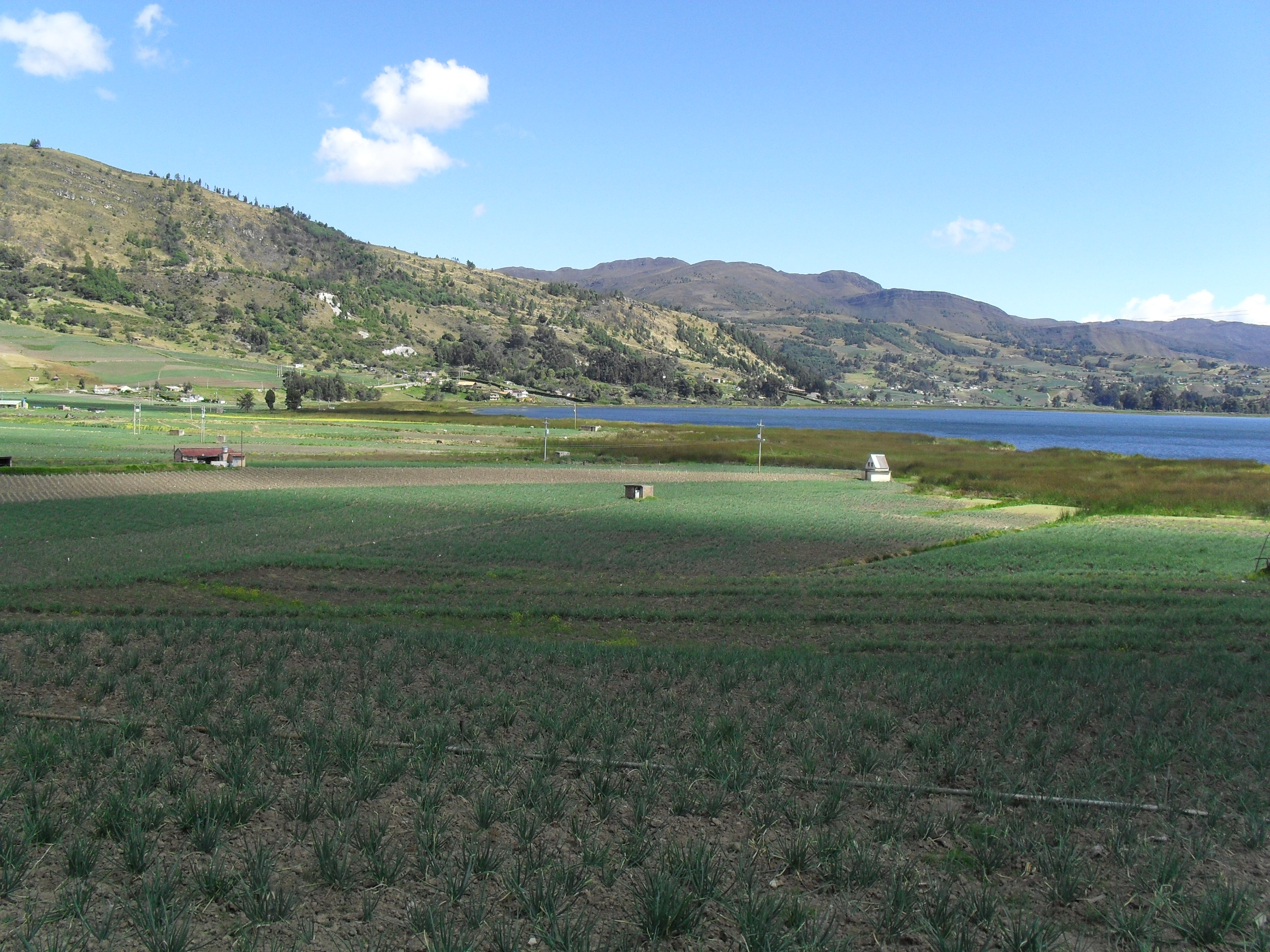
Onion fields

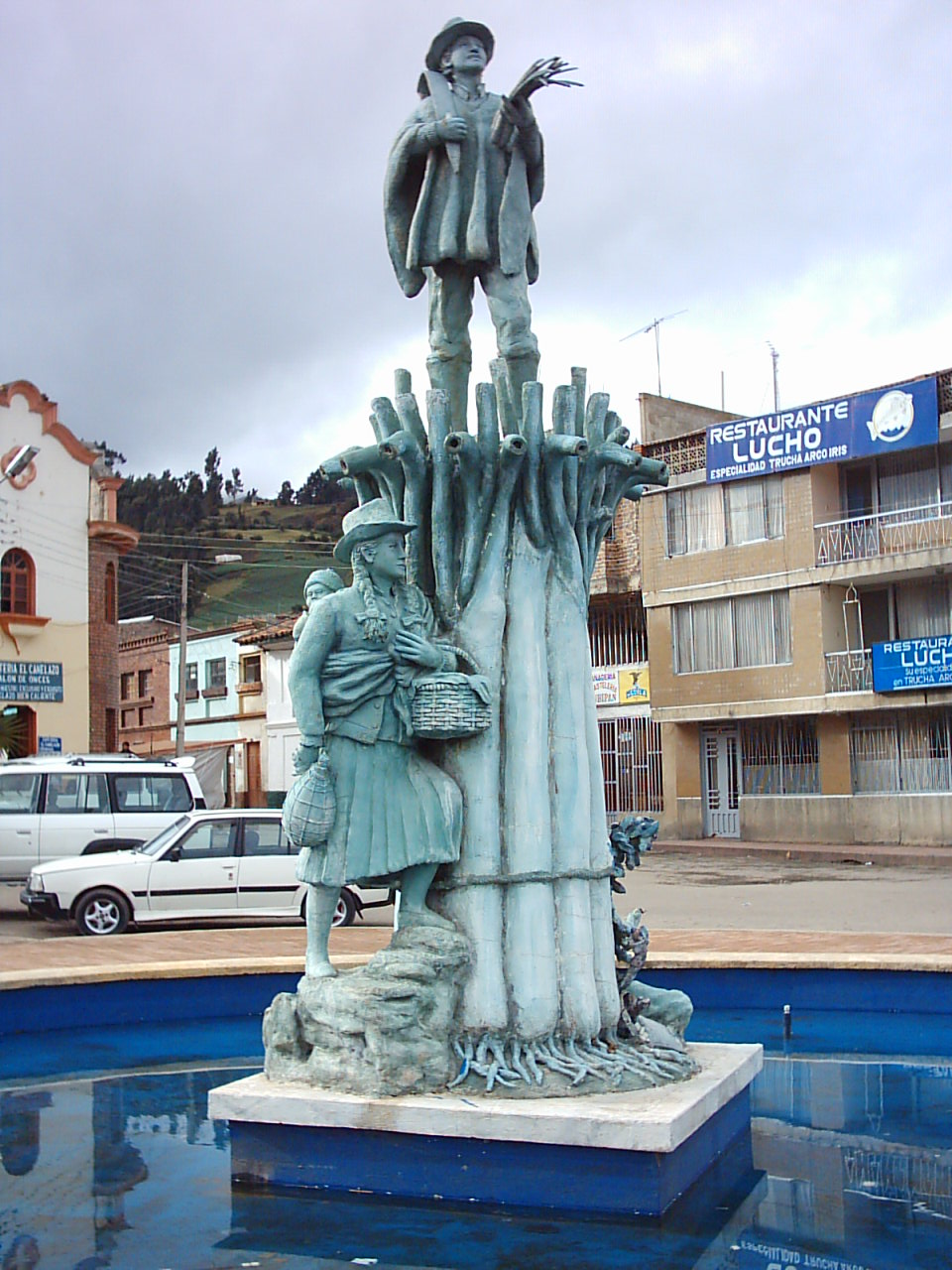
Monument to the onion farmers
