= Zetaquira =

Coordinates: 5°21′N 73°10′W

- Municipality and town
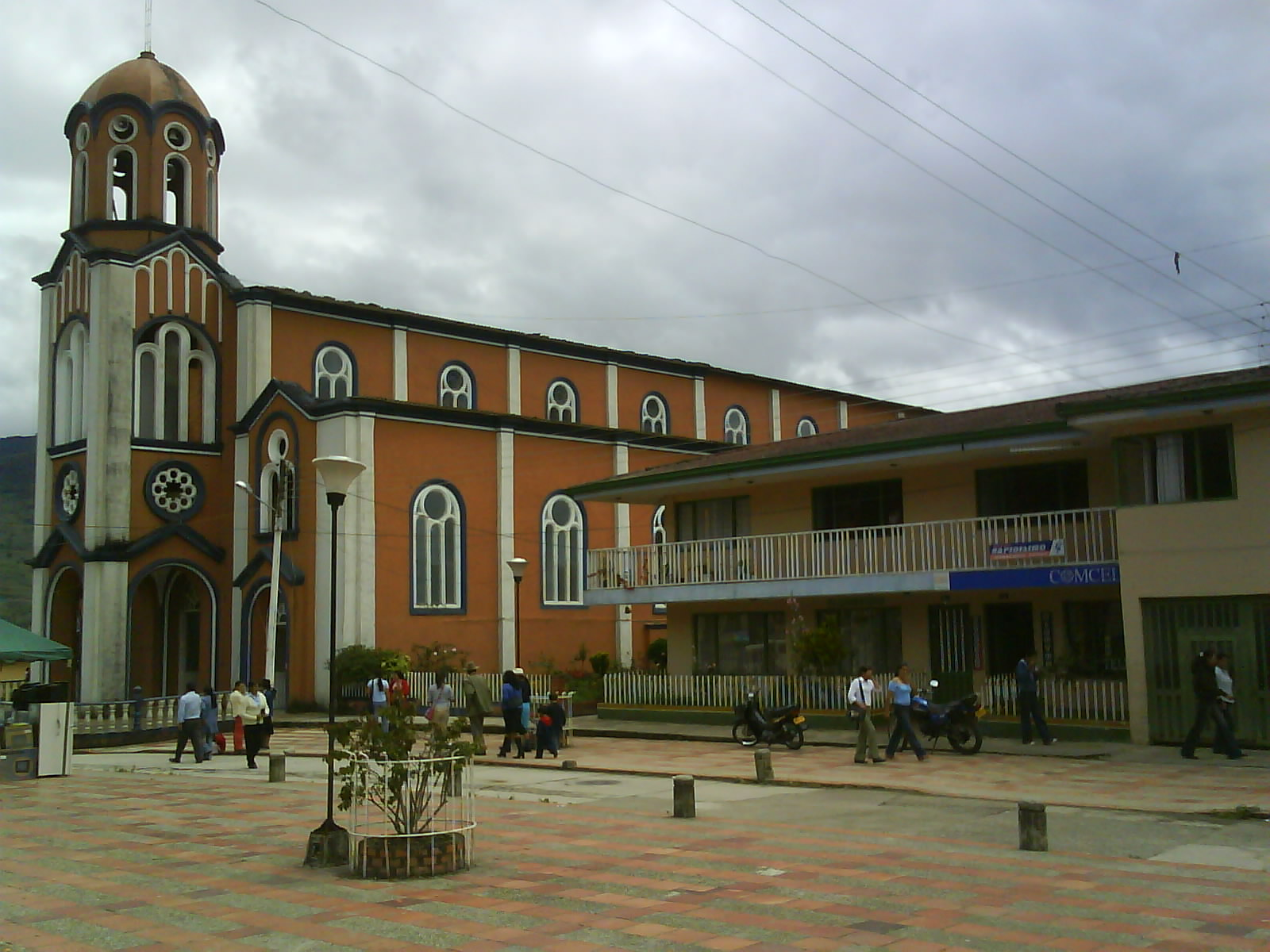
- Church of Zetaquirá

- Flag Seal

- Location of the municipality and town of Zetaquirá in the Boyacá Department of Colombia
- Country: Colombia
- Department: Boyacá Department
- Province: Lengupá Province
- Founded: 21 May 1765
- Founder: Pedro López

Government
  - Mayor: Oscar Yamid Ramírez López (2020-2023)

Area
  - Municipality and town: 262 km^{2} (101 sq mi)
- Elevation: 1,665 m (5,463 ft)

Population (2015)
  - Municipality and town: 4,557
  - Density: 17.4/km^{2} (45.0/sq mi)
  - Urban: 1,059
- Time zone: UTC-5 (Colombia Standard Time)
- Website: Official website

Zetaquira (Note: Also sometimes spelled Zetaquirá) (Spanish pronunciation: [setaˈkiɾa]) is a town and municipality in the Colombian Lengupá Province, part of the department of Boyacá. Zetaquira is located at 67 kilometres (42 mi) from the department capital Tunja and borders Pesca in the north, Miraflores in the south, in the east Berbeo, San Eduardo and Aquitania and in the west Ramiriquí and Chinavita. The municipality stretches over an area of 262 square kilometres (101 mi^{2}) on the Altiplano Cundiboyacense at altitudes between 1,875 metres (6,152 ft) and 3,600 metres (11,800 ft).

== Etymology ==
Zetaquira in Chibcha means "Land of the snake" or "City of the snake".

== History ==
The central highlands of the Colombian Andes in the time before the Spanish conquest were inhabited by various indigenous peoples. The predominant culture was the Muisca, organized in a loose confederation. Zetaquira was part of the reign of the zaque, based in Hunza, present-day Tunja. Other indigenous people in the vicinity of Zetaquira were the Achagua and Tegua.

Modern Zetaquira was not founded until May 21, 1765, by Pedro López.

== Economy ==
Main economical activities of Zetaquira are agriculture and livestock farming. Predominant agricultural products are coffee, sugar cane, maize, bananas, beans and arracacha. Tourism, mainly the thermal baths in the municipality, is another source of income.

== Gallery ==
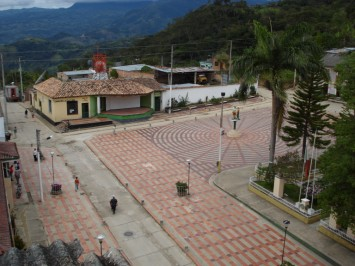
Central square Zetaquirá

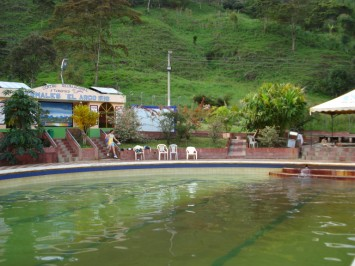
Thermal baths

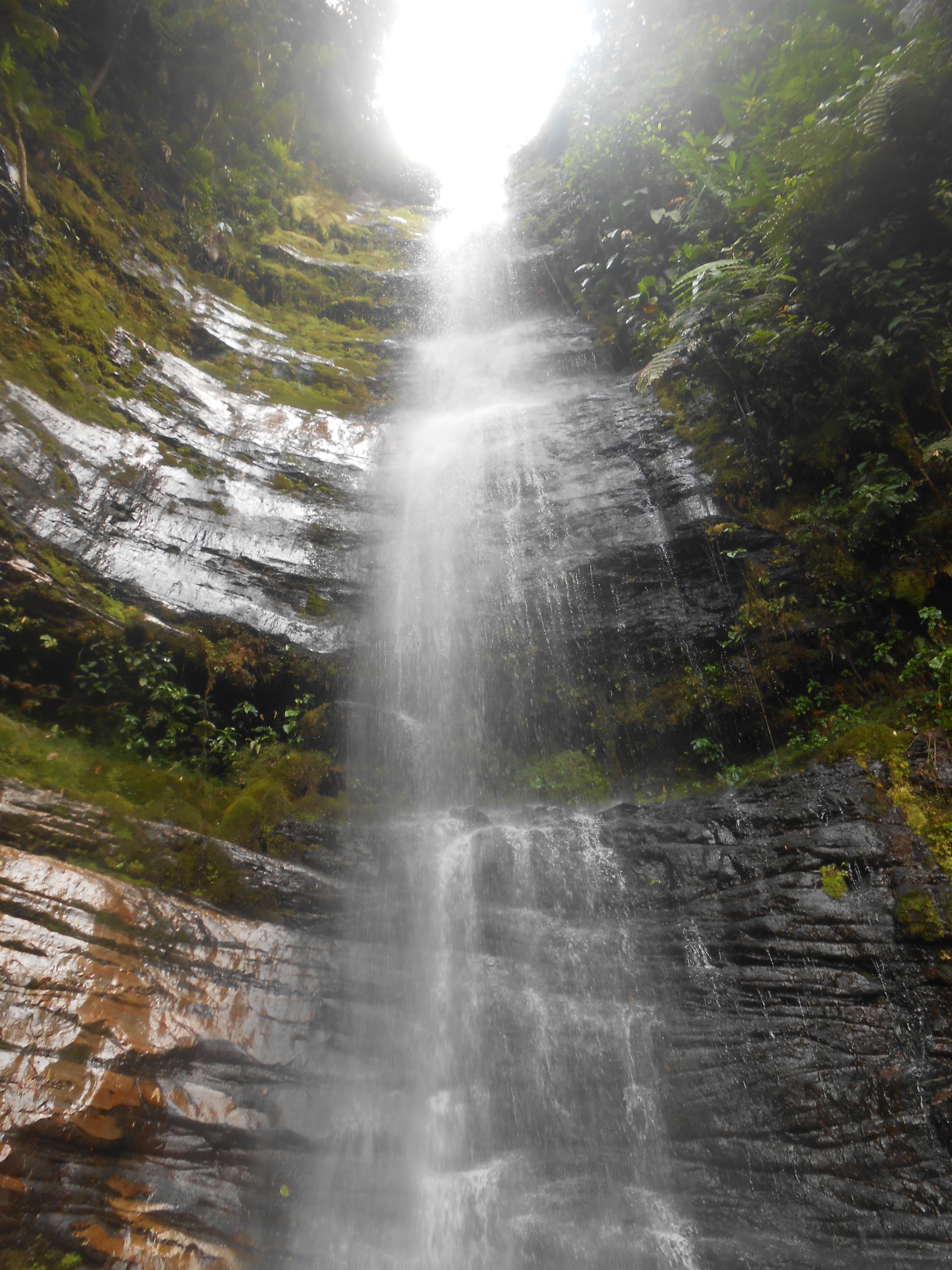
Tinajas waterfall
