= Lengupá Province =

Lengupá Province Provincia de Lengupá
- Province
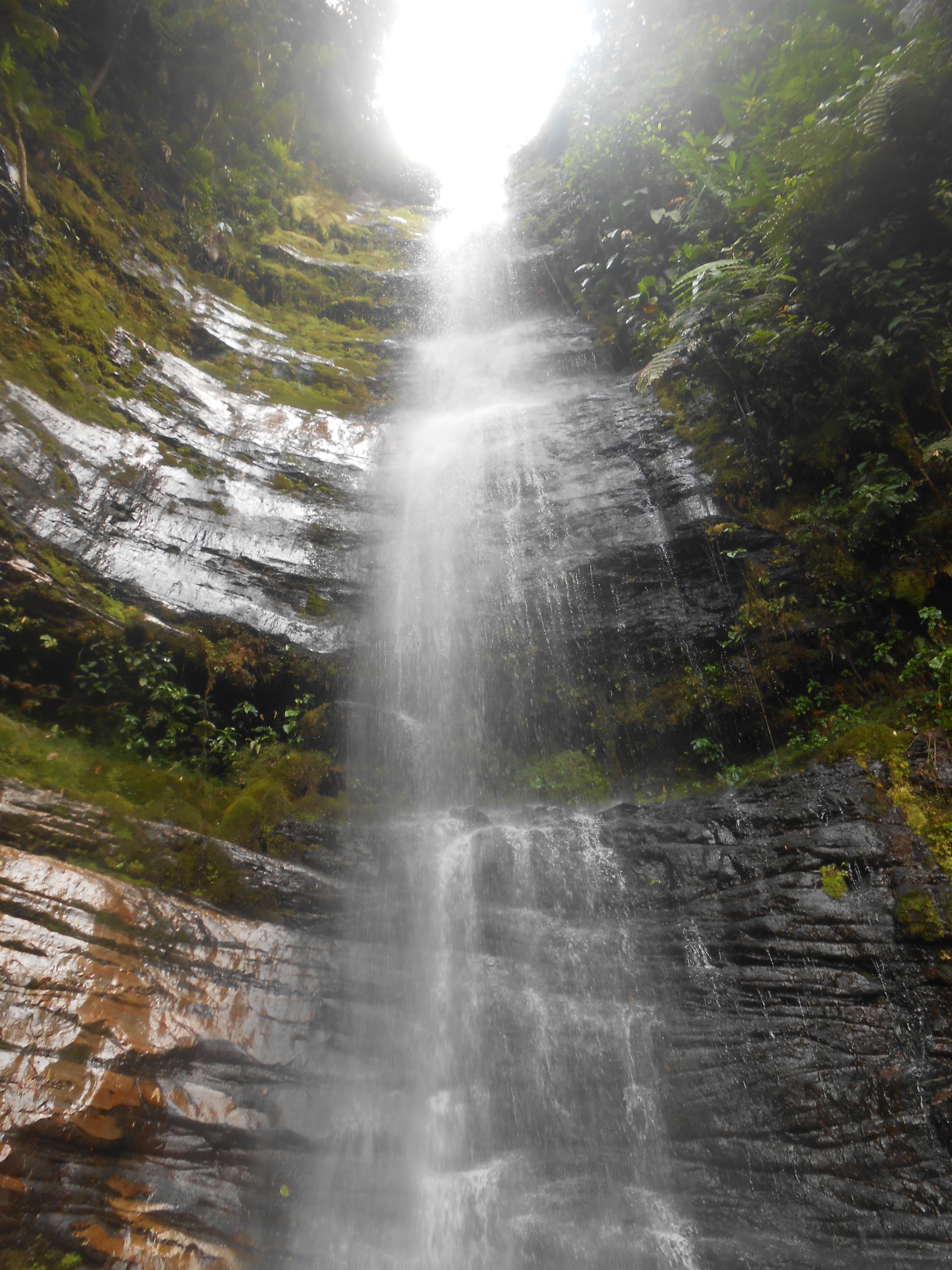
- Waterfall in Zetaquira
- Etymology: Lengupá River
- Location of Lengupá Province in Colombia
- Coordinates: 5°11′47″N 73°08′40″W
- Country: Colombia
- Department: Boyacá
- Capital: Miraflores
- Municipalities: 6

Area
  - Total: 1,645 km^{2} (635 sq mi)
- Time zone: UTC−5 (COT)
- Indigenous groups: Muisca; Tegua

The Lengupá Province is a province of Boyacá Department, Colombia. The province is formed by 6 municipalities.

== Etymology ==
The name of the province and the Lengupá River, after which the province is named, is possibly derived from the Chibcha words Len: "site"; Gua: "of the river"; Paba: "father" or "chief".

== Subdivision ==
Lengupá Province comprises 6 municipalities:

- Miraflores
- Berbeo
- Campohermoso
- Páez
- San Eduardo
- Zetaquirá
