= Tota, Boyacá =

Coordinates: 5°34′N 72°59′W

Tota
- Municipality and town
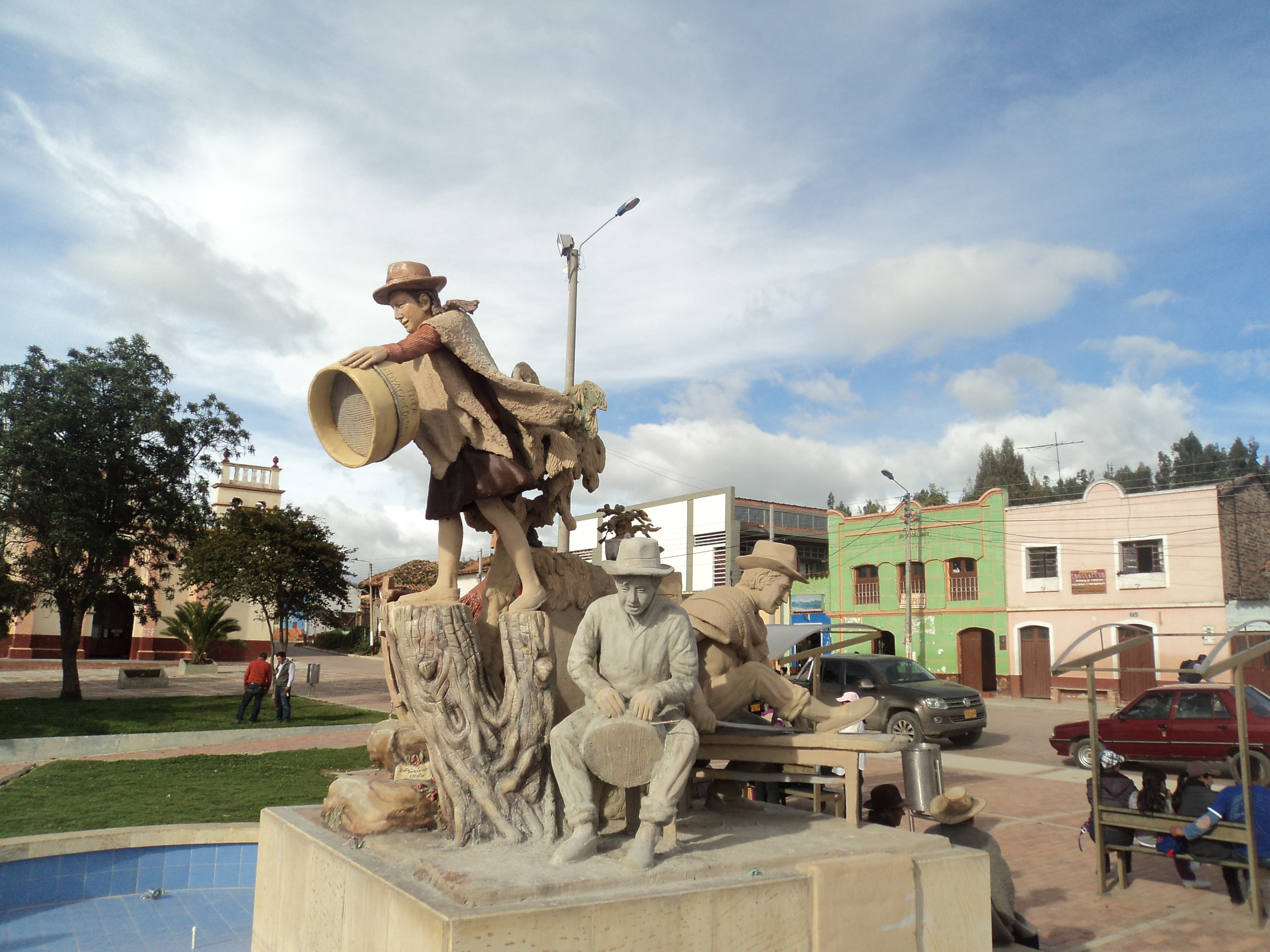
- Monument honouring the weavers, Tota

- Flag

- Location of the municipality and town of Tota in the Boyacá Department of Colombia
- Country: Colombia
- Department: Boyacá Department
- Province: Sugamuxi Province
- Founder: Gonzalo Jiménez de Quesada

Government
  - Mayor: Eriverto Cruz Riaño (2020-2023)

Area
  - Municipality and town: 314 km^{2} (121 sq mi)
- Elevation: 2,870 m (9,420 ft)

Population (2015)
  - Municipality and town: 5,386
  - Density: 17.2/km^{2} (44.4/sq mi)
  - Urban: 559
- Time zone: UTC-5 (Colombia Standard Time)
- Website: Official website

Tota is a town and municipality in the department of Boyacá, Colombia, part of the Sugamuxi Province. Tota is located approximately 40 km from Sogamoso and the municipality borders in the north Cuítiva, Aquitania in the east, Zetaquirá and San Eduardo in the south and westward of Tota the municipality of Pesca is located. Nearby and named after the village is Lake Tota, the largest lake of Colombia.

== History ==
Before the Spanish conquest of the central highlands of Colombia (Altiplano Cundiboyacense), the area around Tota was inhabited by the Muisca, ruled by the zaque of Hunza, currently known as Tunja. In the Chibcha language of the Muisca, Tota means "tillage of the river".

The first European to enter the territories of the northern Muisca Confederation was Gonzalo Jiménez de Quesada.

== Economy ==
The economical activities of Tota are mainly agriculture (potatoes, carrots, peas, onions and others), livestock farming, mining and tourism (Lake Tota).

== Gallery ==
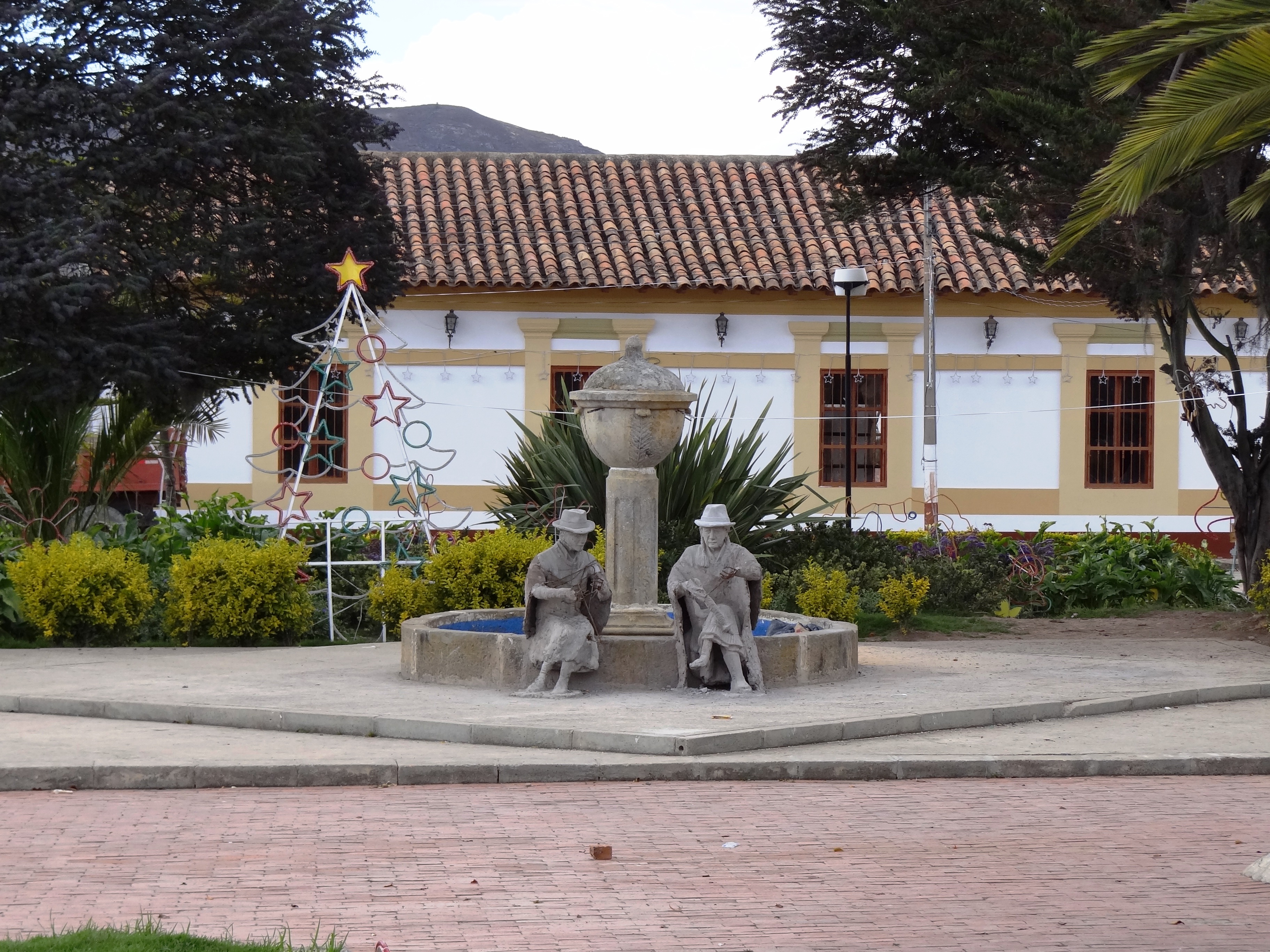
Central square and park of Tota

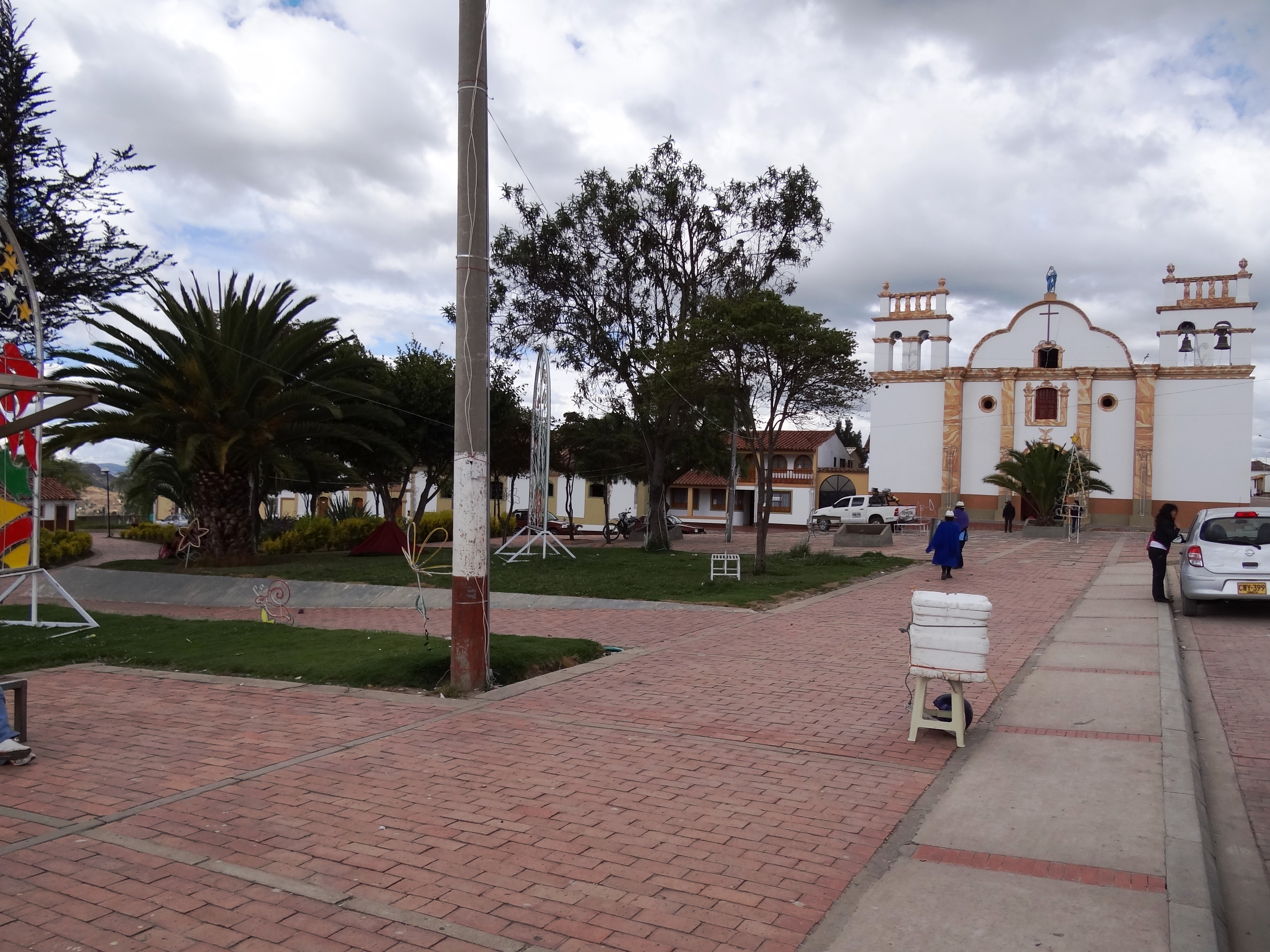
Central square

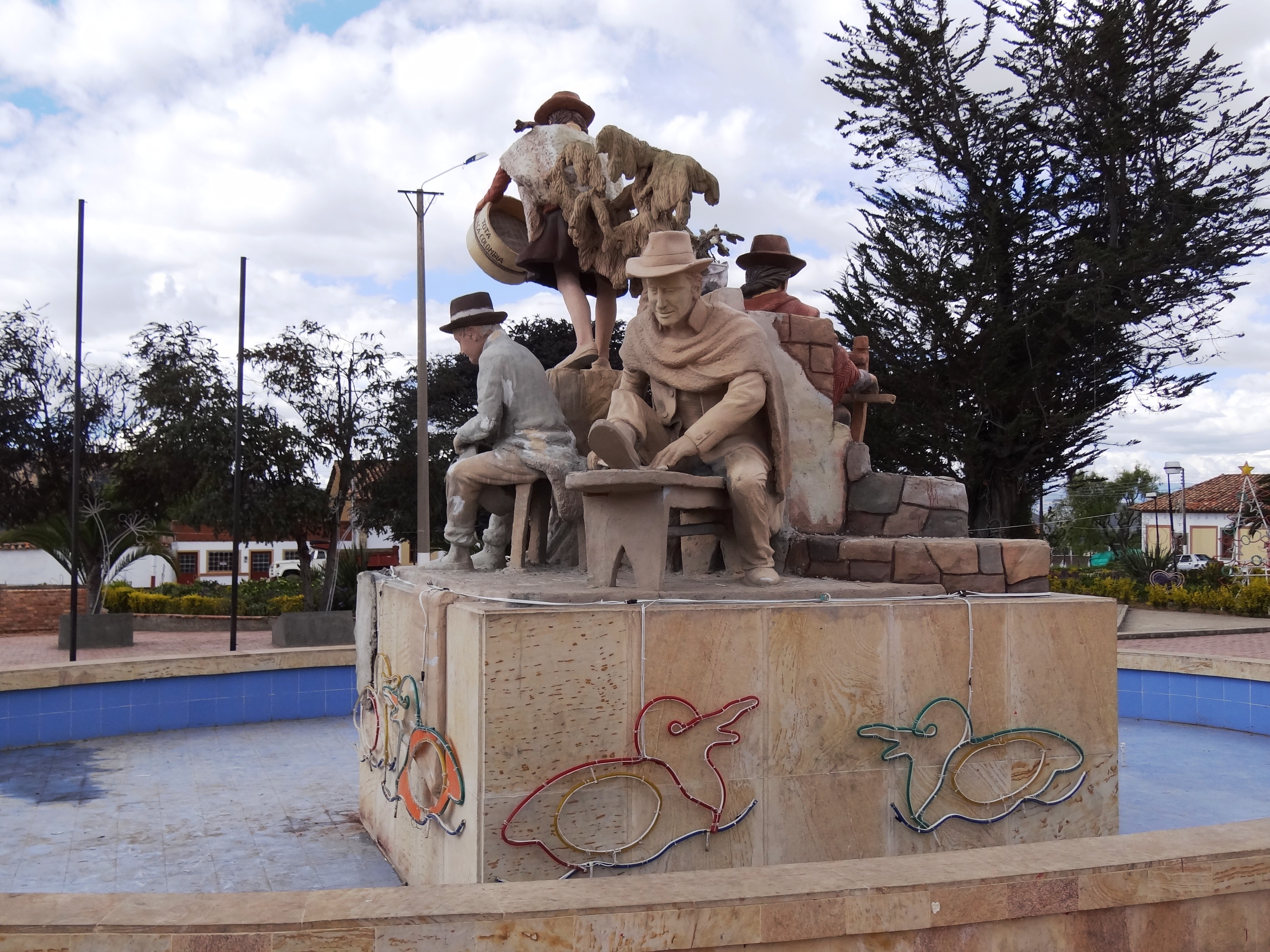
Monument honouring the weavers, central square
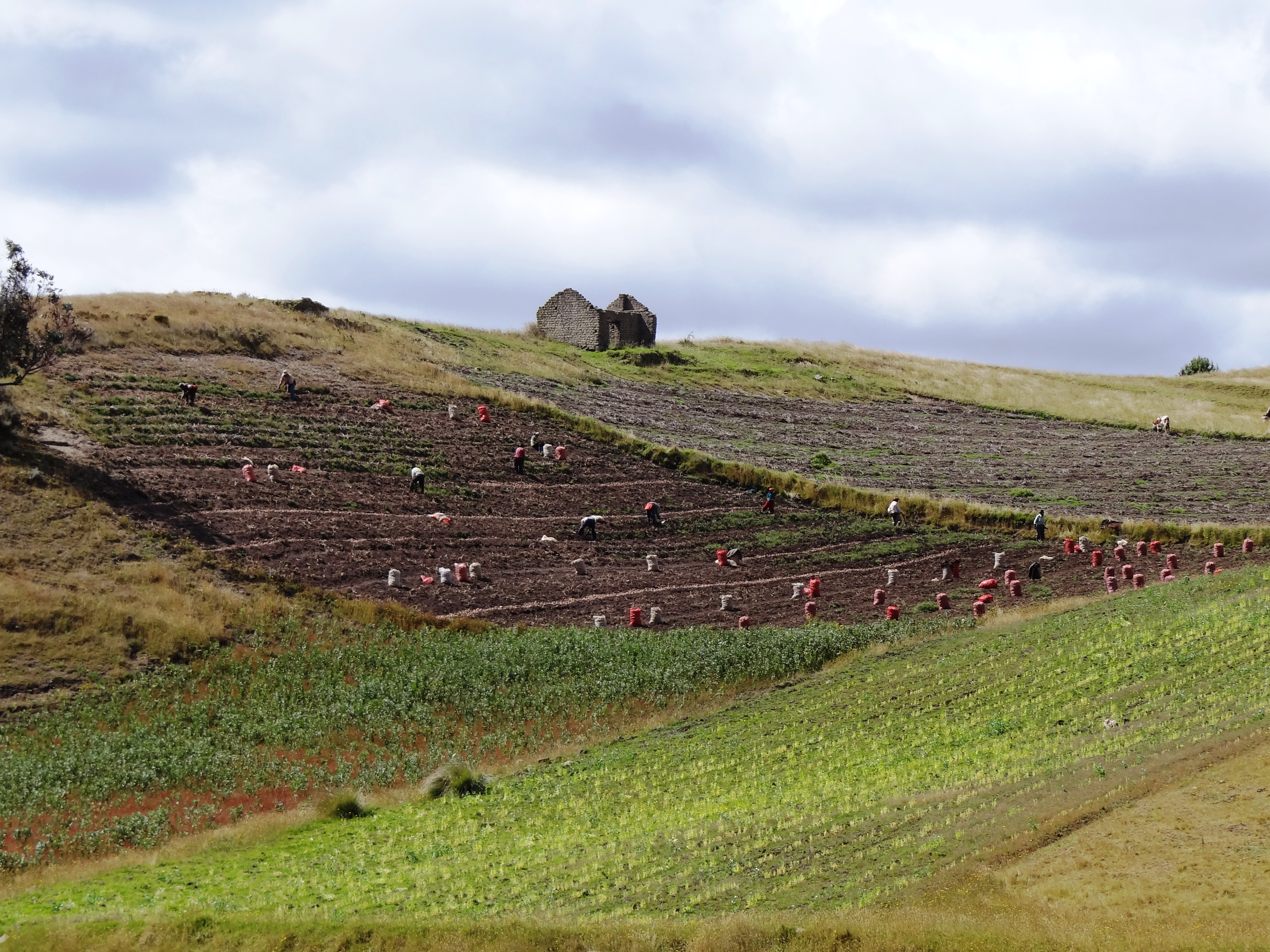
Potato fields around Lake Tota

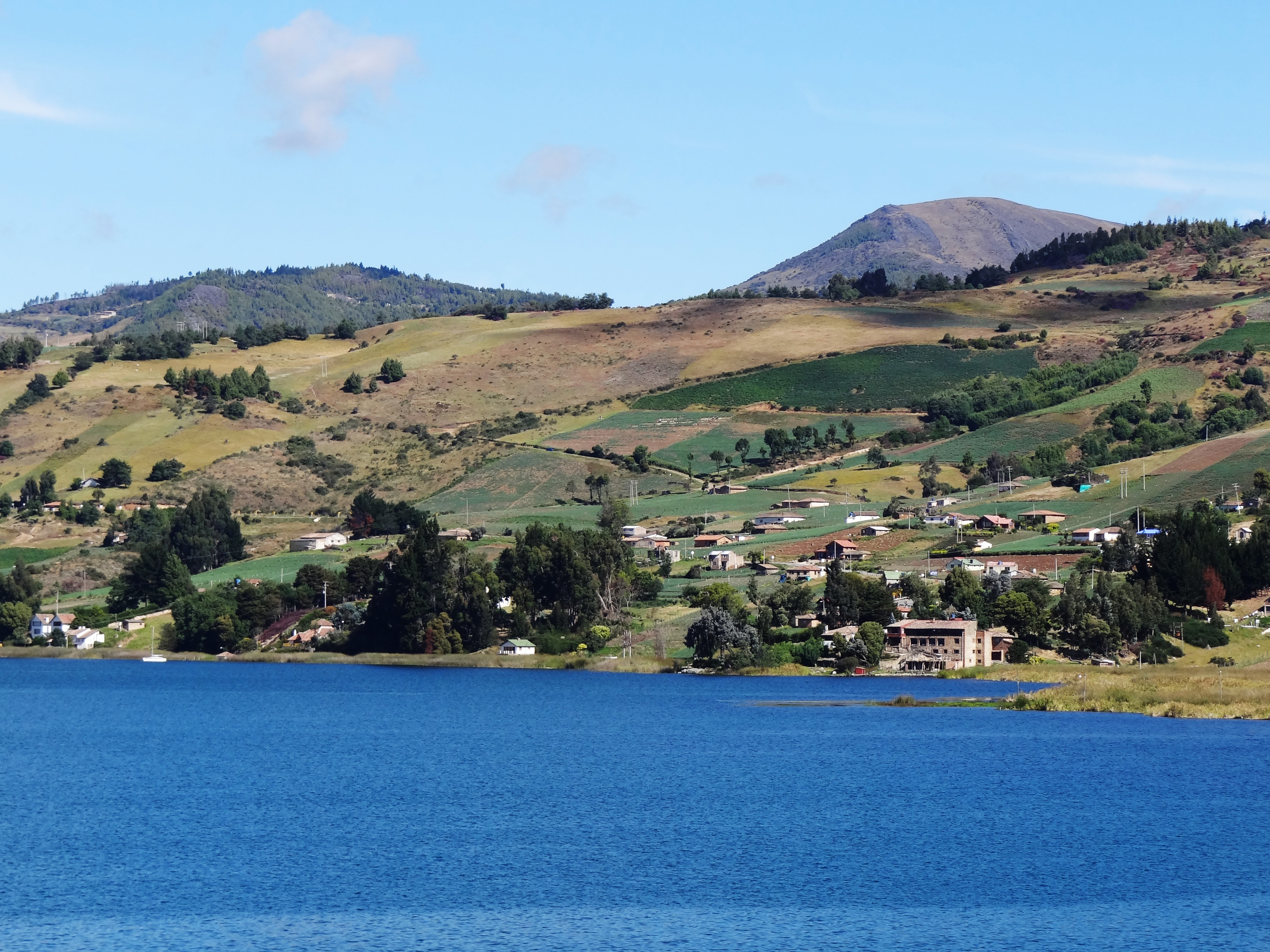
Lake Tota

== See also ==
- Lake Tota
