= Berbeo =

Berbeo San Fernando de Aguablanca, Lengupá
- Municipality and town
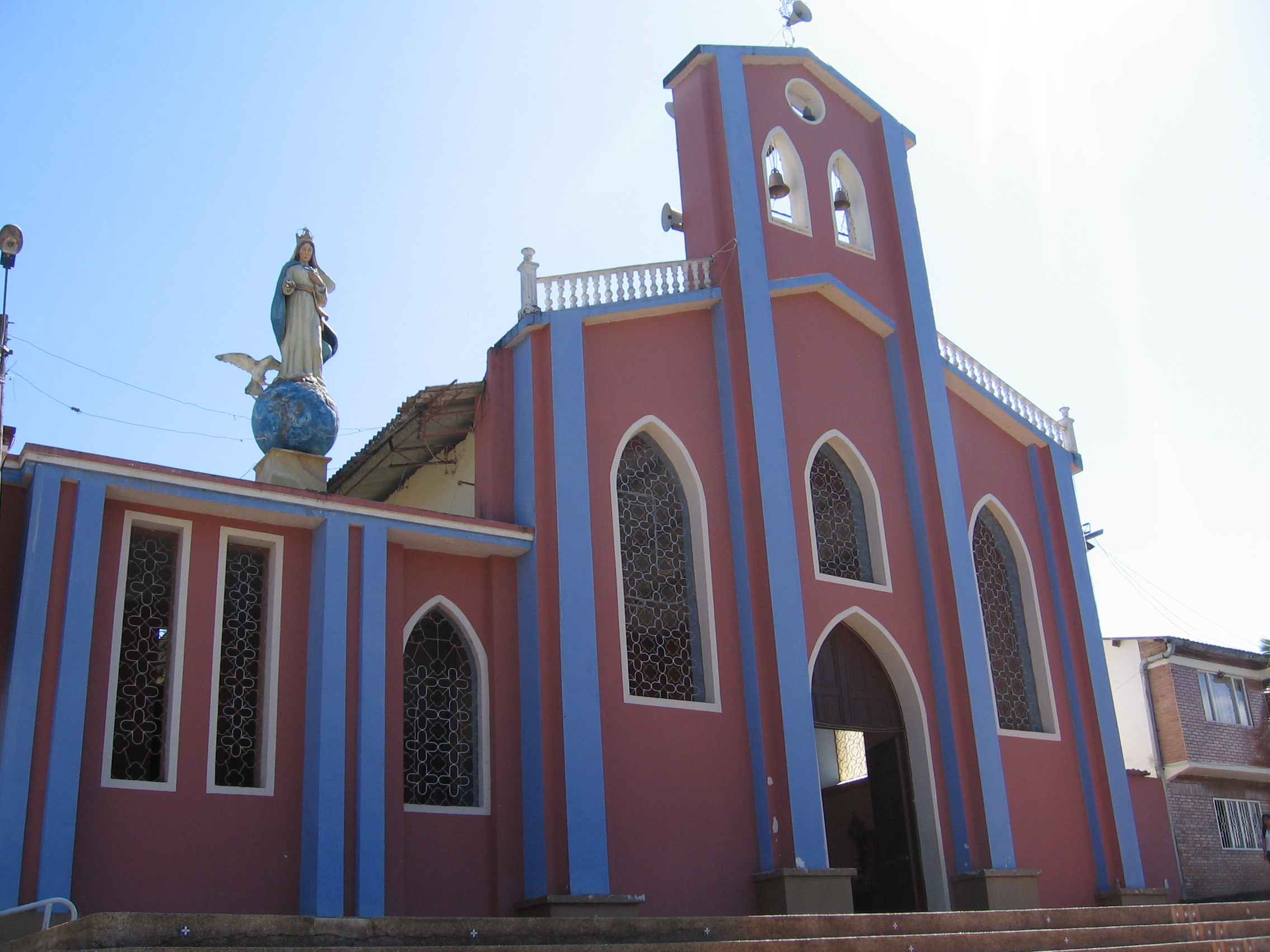
- Church of Berbeo

- Flag Coat of arms

- Location of the municipality and town of Berbeo in the Boyacá Department of Colombia
- Coordinates: 5°13′36″N 73°07′36″W
- Country: Colombia
- Department: Boyacá Department
- Province: Lengupá Province
- Founded: 23 April 1743
- Founder: Jesuits

Government
  - Mayor: Sebastian Juez Arias (2024-2027)

Area
  - Municipality and town: 61.72 km^{2} (23.83 sq mi)
  - Urban: 0.13 km^{2} (0.050 sq mi)
- Elevation: 1,350 m (4,430 ft)

Population (2015)
  - Municipality and town: 1,932
  - Density: 31.30/km^{2} (81.07/sq mi)
  - Urban: 529
- Time zone: UTC-5 (Colombia Standard Time)
- Website: Official website

Berbeo is a town and municipality in the Lengupá Province, part of the Colombian department of Boyacá. The urban centre of Berbeo is located at an altitude of 1,350 metres (4,430 ft) in the Eastern Ranges of the Colombian Andes. Berbeo borders San Eduardo in the east, Zetaquirá and Miraflores in the west, Zetaquirá in the north and Miraflores and Páez in the south.

== Etymology ==
The municipality was formerly called San Fernando de Aguablanca and Legupá, and since 1913 bears the name Berbeo, after Juan Francisco Berbeo.

== History ==
The area of Berbeo before the Spanish conquest was inhabited by the indigenous Muisca. In Berbeo petroglyphs have been discovered. Modern Berbeo was founded on April 23, 1743, by Jesuits.

== Economy ==
Main activity of Berbeo is agriculture, with coffee and chonto tomatoes as major products.

== Gallery ==
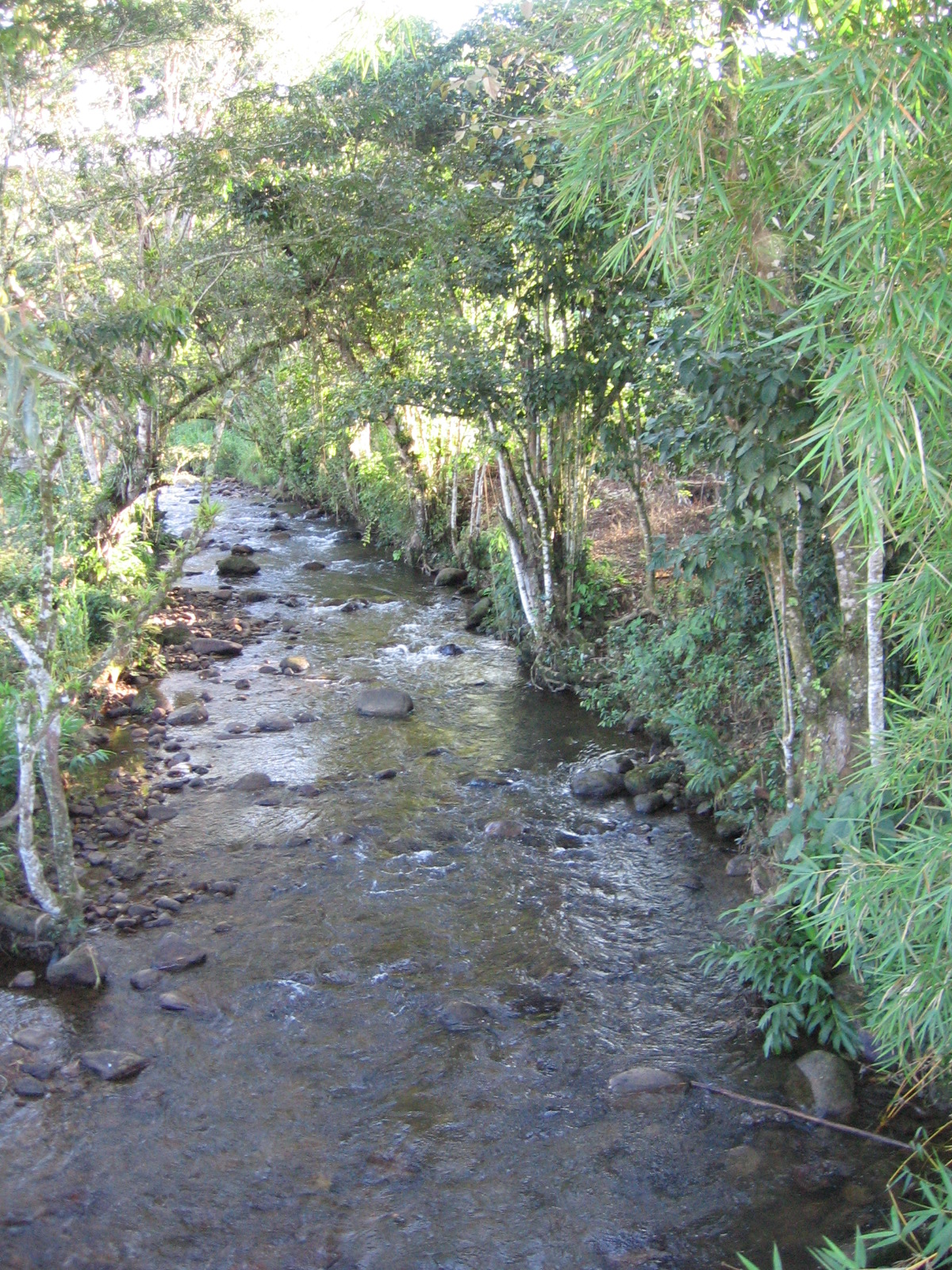
Agua Blanca creek

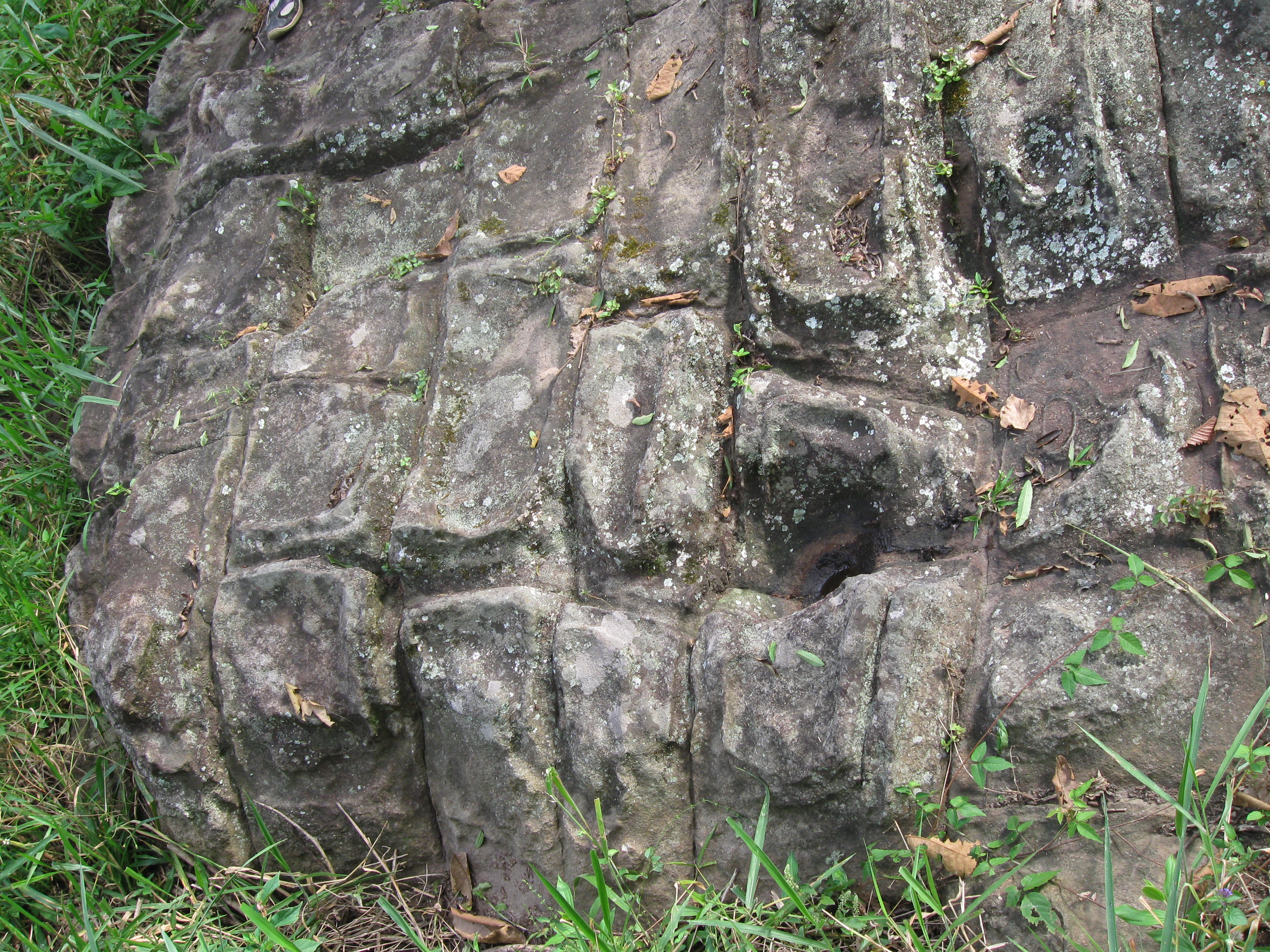
Petroglyphs

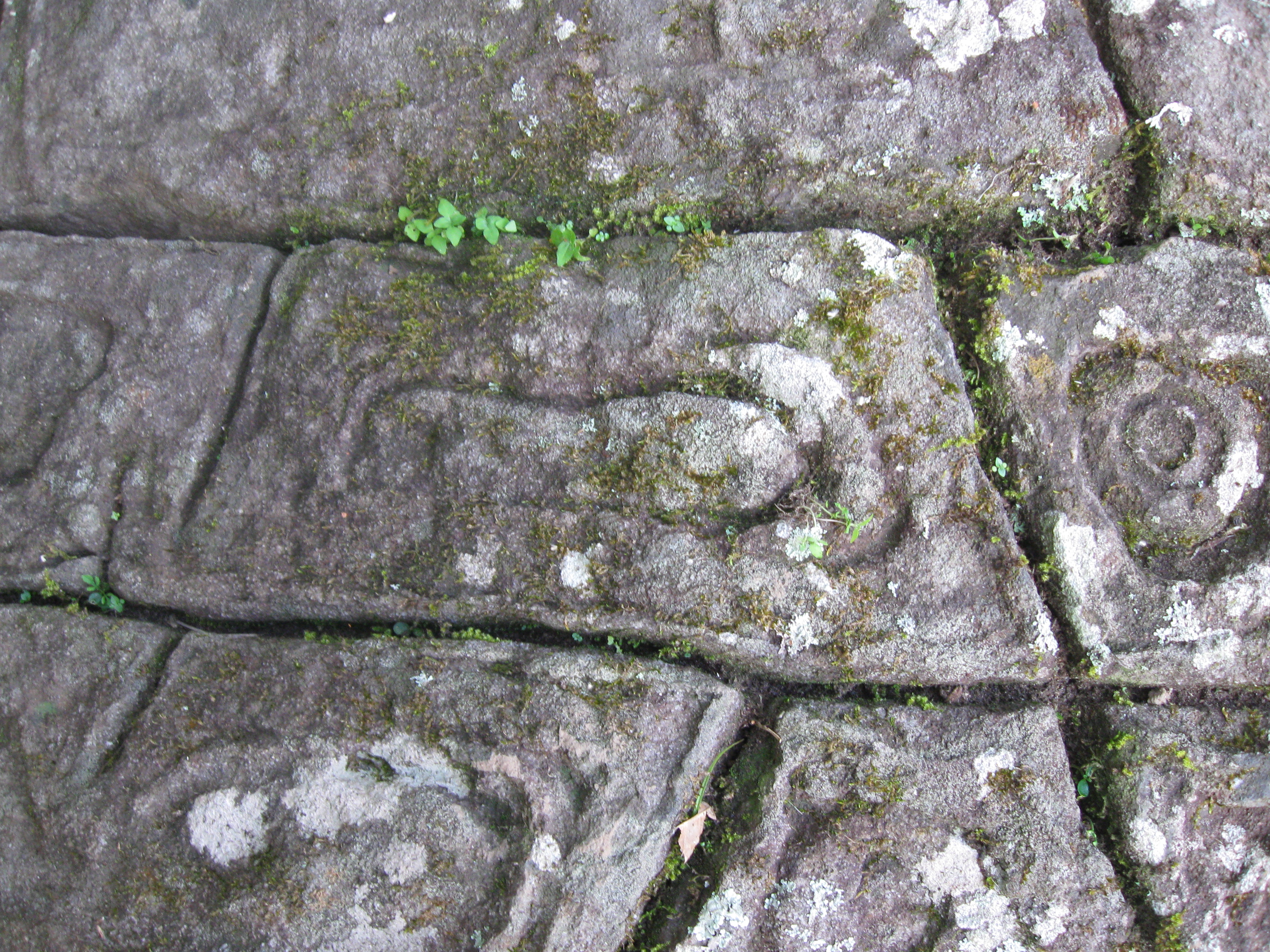
Petroglyphs
