= Guayupe =

Indigenous group in modern-day Colombia

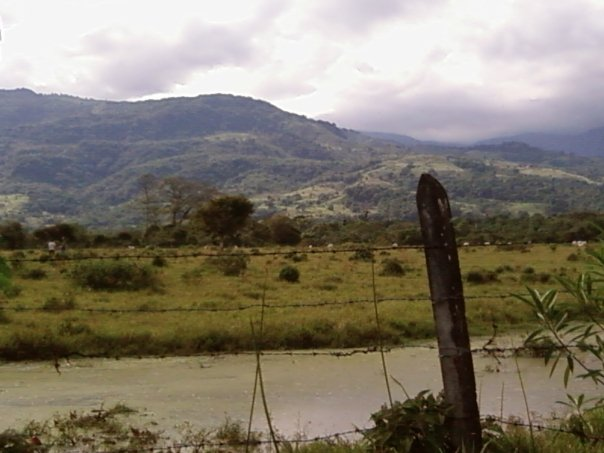
- Landscape in Acacías, terrain of the Guayupe

Total population
- 250,000 (1537)

Regions with significant populations
- Meta, Colombia

Languages
- Arawakan, Colombian Spanish

Religion
- Traditional religion, Catholicism

Related ethnic groups
- Guahibo, Muisca, Sutagao, Tegua, U'wa

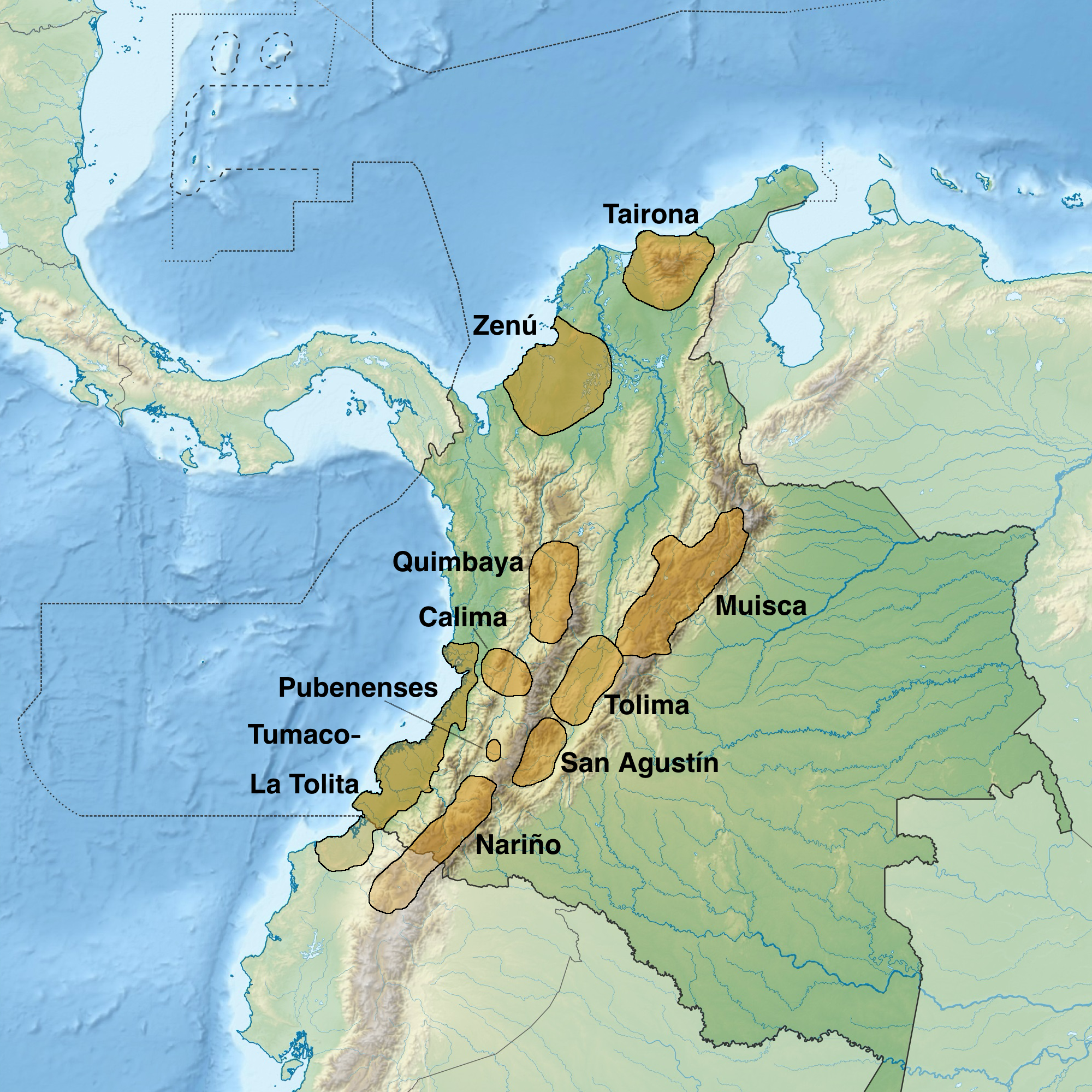
Map of pre-Columbian civilizations. The Guayupe lived east of the Muisca

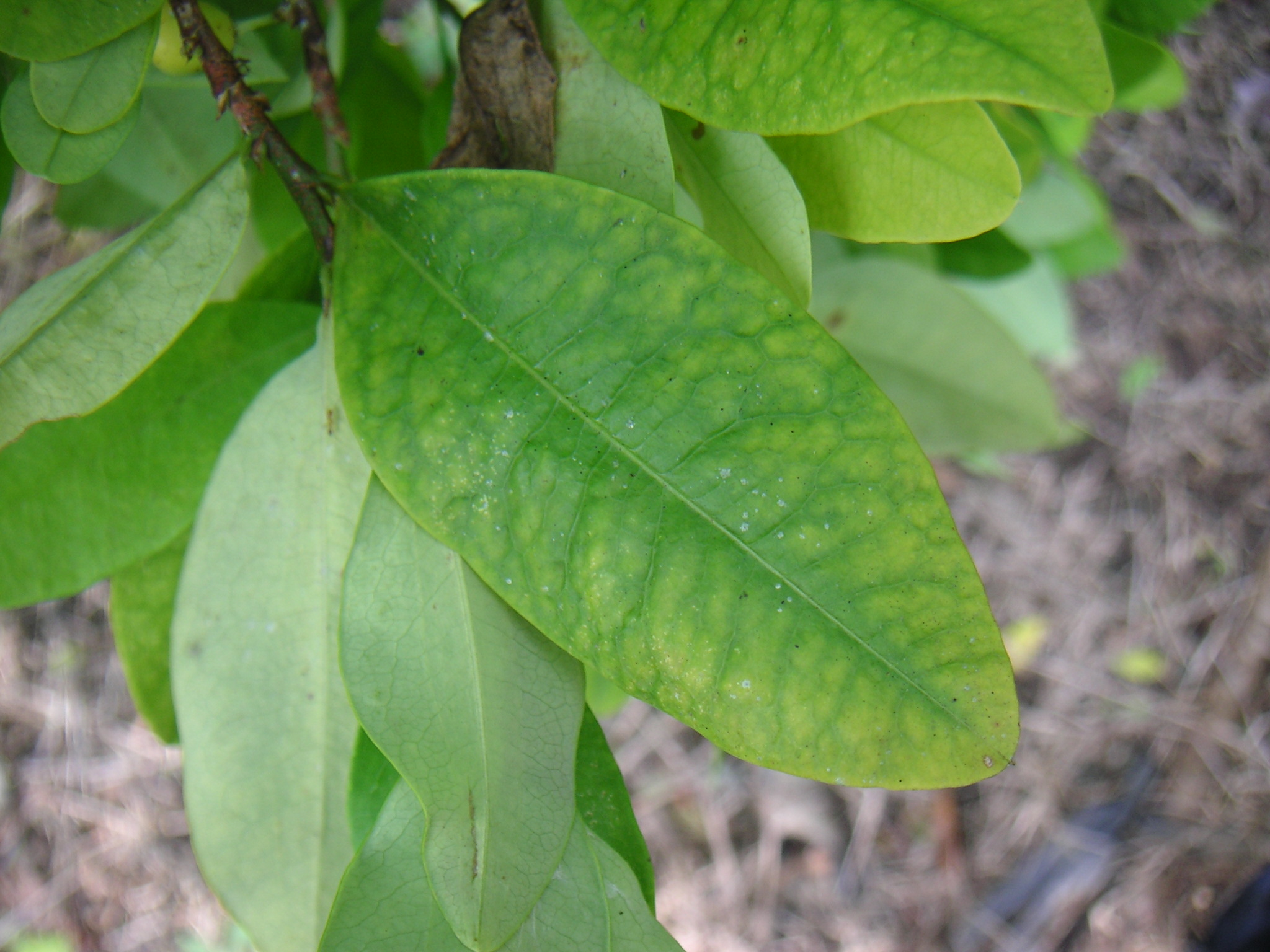
Coca was used by the Guayupe in their rituals

The Guayupe are an Arawak-speaking Indigenous group of people in modern-day Colombia. They inhabit the westernmost parts of the department of Meta. At the time of the Spanish conquest, more than 250,000 Guayupe were living in large parts of Meta.

The territories of the Guayupe stretched from the neighbouring Guahibo terrains to the east and north and the Muisca territories to the west over an area of 22,000 square kilometres (8,500 sq mi).

Knowledge of the Guayupe has been provided by Pedro de Aguado and others.

== Guayupe territory ==
The territory of the Guayupe before the Spanish conquest stretched from the rivers Upía and Guayabero to the peaks of the Eastern Ranges of the Colombian Andes. Their area covered around 22,000 square kilometres (8,500 sq mi). The Guayupe lived mostly around the Ariari River.

=== Municipalities belonging to Guayupe territories ===
Name	Department	Altitude (m) urban centre	Map
Acacías	Meta	498	
Barranca de Upía	Meta	200	
El Calvario	Meta	1987	
Cubarral	Meta	534	
Cumaral	Meta	452	
Fuente de Oro	Meta	359	
Granada	Meta	372	
Guamal	Meta	525	
Restrepo	Meta	570	
San Juan de Arama	Meta	510	
San Juanito	Meta	1795	
Villavicencio	Meta	467	

== Description ==
The first report on the Guayupe nation is from German conquistador Philipp von Hutten, participant of the expedition led by Georg Hohermuth von Speyer from Coro in Venezuela to the borders of the Amazon bassin (1535 - 1538). He describes them as "very good looking people and very able in defending themselves." Indeed, Hohermuths army never was able to make peace with the Guayupe, crossing their entire land from the northern shores of Upía river down to the regions south of the Guaviare river. On their way, the conquistadors were engaged in various skirmishes and even in a big battle with the Guayupe warriors. "They tried their luck on us frequently but although they killed and wounded many of us, we always gave them the rawer deal. This nation fights with bow and arrow and spears and shields made of tapir skin, and they throw gins." The Germans were not the first Europeans to encounter the Guayupe. Near the Guaviare river they found some items of clearly European origin. As they knew later, it were belongings of an expedition led by Alonso de Herrera, who likely came up the Guaviare river with boats. In 1534, the Guayupe "had slaughtered 90 of Herrera's men and the survivors escaped downstream. In Coro, we met some of them."

The Guayupe are a tribe of farmers living in the tropical mountain forests of the Eastern Ranges and the Llanos of Meta, Colombia. In pre-Columbian times they constructed palisades around their villages consisting of houses around a central square with a ceremonial building in the middle. Because of the sophisticated defence works including palisades, thorn bushes and well-camouflaged pitfalls, the Spanish soldiers in Hohermuth's army nicknamed one of those well fortified villages "Little Salses", referring to the Catalan Fort de Salses, an innovative type of fortress at this time. The Guayupe were an agricultural society with yuca one of their main crops. The Guayupe people went naked, only ornamented with gold, feathers and shells.

The Guayupe society was organised around the caciques; chiefs of the community. The cacique was regarded as an important person who lived by strict norms in the ceremonial activities; births, marriages and burials. When a cacique of the Guayupe died, the body was cremated and his successor had to drink his ash mixed with chicha. The society of the Guayupe was egalitarian; caciques only had the use of stools and more feathers on their blankets. At every marriage, half of the bride treasure was going to the cacique.

They built canoes of wood and consumed yuca and casabe, fish and meat. They did not eat bird meat.

According to scholar Pedro de Aguado, the Guayupe defecated in the rivers around and not near their houses.

=== Religion ===
As in the Muisca religion, the main gods were the Sun and the Moon who were husband and wife. The supreme being of the Guayupe, in the Muisca religion called Chiminigagua, was Inaynagui.

The products the Guayupe used in their rituals were coca and tobacco. Cannibalism is not reported of the Guayupe.

=== Modern age ===
In 1996, fifteen ceramic pots were found, pertaining to the Guayupe culture. In 2011, after the excavation of a Guayupe burial site, the museum of the Guayupe in Fuente de Oro was opened, containing bones, burial urns, artefacts and plates. As of 2009 yearly a Reina de Guayupe, miss contest in Puerto Santander, located at 16 kilometres (9.9 mi) from the urban centre of Fuente de Oro, is held among the Guayupe.

== See also ==
- Muisca
- Achagua, Tegua, Sutagao

== Bibliography ==
- Díaz Moreno, Ingrid (2012), "Puerto Santander, cuna de la cultura guayupe: Patrimonialización y formación del Estado en el departemento del Meta - Puerto Santander, crib of the Guayupe culture: heritage and formation of the State in the Meta Department" (PDF), Tabula Rasa (in Spanish), 17: 171–193, doi:10.25058/20112742.132, ISSN 1794-2489
- Mácha, Přemysl; Gómez Pellón, José Eloy (2014), Masks of Identity: Representing and Performing Otherness in Latin America, Cambridge Scholars Publishing, pp. 1–185, ISBN 9781443860758
- Onofrio, Jan (1995), Dictionary of Indian Tribes of the Americas, American Indian Publishers, pp. 1–1047, ISBN 9780937862285
- Ruiz Churión, Jairo (2010), Guayupes (video) (in Spanish)
- Fray Pedro Aguado. Recopilación Historial, Parte 2, Vol. III. Bogotá 1957.
- Hutten, Philipp von; Schmitt, Eberhard (1999), Das Gold der Neuen Welt die Papiere des Welser-Konquistadors und Generalkapitäns von Venezuela Philipp von Hutten 1534 - 1541 (in German), Berlin, ISBN 978-3-87061-862-9 OCLC 254379651
