= Miraflores Municipality =

Miraflores Municipality may refer to:

- Miraflores, Guaviare, Colombia
- Miraflores, Boyacá, Colombia
