= Guahibo people =

Guahibo
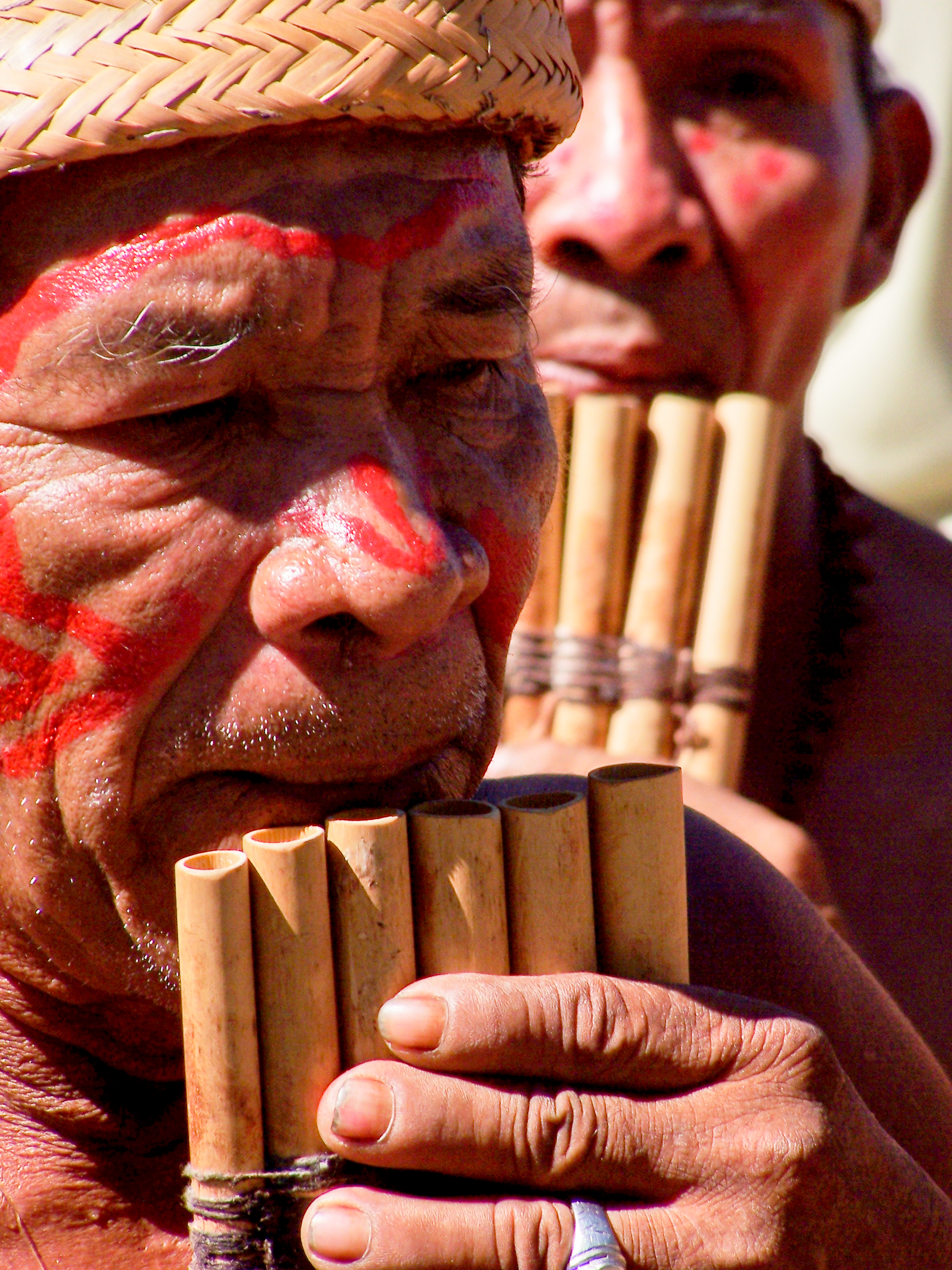
- Guahibo in Venezuela playing a siku

Total population
- approx. 24,000

Regions with significant populations
- Colombia: 23,006 (2005 Census)
- Venezuela: 8,428 (2001 census)

Languages
- Guahibo, Colombian Spanish, Venezuelan Spanish

Religion
- Animism, Catholicism

Related ethnic groups
- Achagua, Guayupe, Hiwi, Tegua, U'wa

The Guahibo people are an Indigenous people native to the Llanos or savanna plains in eastern Colombia (Arauca, Meta, Guainia, and Vichada departments) and in southern Venezuela near the Colombian border. Their population was estimated at 23,772 people in 1998.

A related group, sometimes considered a sub-tribe of the Guahibo, are the Playero, whose population, estimated in the early 1980s at 200 people, live along the Arauca River.

== Municipalities belonging to Guahibo territory ==
The Guahibo inhabited the Llanos of Arauca.

Name	Department	Altitude (m) urban centre	Map
Arauquita	Arauca	165	
Fortul	Arauca	246	
Tame	Arauca	340	
Labranzagrande (shared with Achagua & U'wa)	Boyacá	1210	

== History ==
An 1856 watercolor by Manuel María Paz is an early depiction of the Guahibo people in Casanare Province.

From the late 1700s until at least 1970s, Guahibos and the related Cuiva people suffered severe, if sporadic, violence at the hand of Colombian and Venezuelan colonists. Episodes of violence included an 1870 massacre of over two hundred Guahibos organized by Venezuelan hacendado Pedro del Carmen Gutiérrez. Hunting parties were organized to target the Indigenous people over this period, a phenomenon portrayed in José Eustasio Rivera's 1924 novel La Vorágine. In 1912, Colombian military officer Buenaventura Bustos wrote a letter reporting the situation: "The ‘civilized’ decimate them with bullets and pursue them without mercy, wheresoever they are, because they have an intimate conviction, and this they say without Christian shame, that they can murder savages as if they were killing beasts."

== Language ==
Guahibo (ISO 639: GUH) belongs to the Guahiboan languages language family of South America. The existing dialects are: Guahibo (Sikuani), Amorua (Río Tomo Guahibo) and Tigrero. They each have their own languages but many are lost, now replaced by Spanish. Despite 55% illiteracy, there is a written form of Guahibo. There is a Guahibo newspaper, dictionary and grammar book.

== See also ==
- Achagua people
- Guayupe people
- U'wa people
