= Achagua people =

Indigenous people of Colombia and Venezuela

Achagua
Total population
- 980

Regions with significant populations
- Colombia, Venezuela

Languages
- Achagua

Religion
- Traditional religion

Related ethnic groups
- Guahibo, U'wa, and Other Arawakan-speaking peoples Especially Baniwa, Tariana, and Tegua

The Achagua (also Achawa and Axagua) are an Indigenous people of Colombia and Venezuela. At the time of the Spanish colonization of the Americas, their territory covered the present-day Venezuelan states of Bolívar, Guárico and Barinas. In the late twentieth century there were several hundred Achaguas remaining.

== Municipalities belonging to Achagua territories ==
Name	Department	Altitude (m) urban centre	Map
Támara (shared with U'wa)	Casanare	1156	
Nunchía (shared with U'wa)	Casanare	398	
Yopal	Casanare	390	
Aguazul (shared with Tegua)	Casanare	290	
Tauramena	Casanare	460	
Recetor (shared with Tegua)	Casanare	800	
Chámeza (shared with Tegua)	Casanare	1150	
Paya	Boyacá	970	
Labranzagrande (shared with U'wa & Guahibo)	Boyacá	1210	

== Culture ==
Achagua people live in large villages. Clans live together in communal houses. Polygamy is commonplace. They farm crops, such as bitter cassava. They traditionally poison their arrows with curare.

== Language ==
Achagua people speak the Achagua language, a Maipurean Arawakan language.

== See also ==
- U'wa
- Guayupe, Tegua
