= Lake Tota =

Largest lake in Colombia

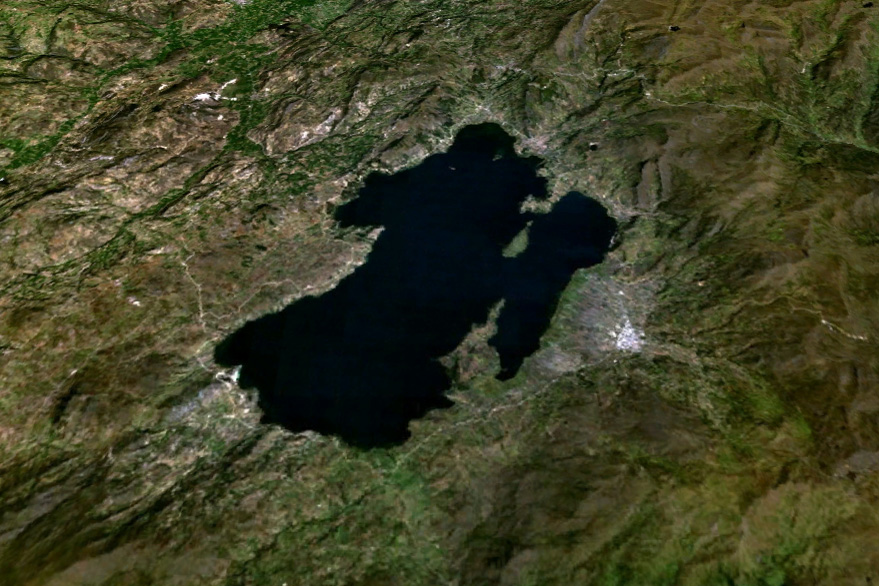
- Satellite view of Lake Tota

- Location within Boyacá Department Location within Colombia
- Location: Boyacá
- Coordinates: 5°32′24″N 72°55′12″W
- Basin countries: Colombia
- Max. length: 12 km (7.5 mi)
- Max. width: 7.2 km (4.5 mi)
- Surface area: 55 km^{2} (21 sq mi)
- Max. depth: 62 m (203 ft)
- Surface elevation: 3,015 m (9,892 ft)
- Islands: San Pedro, Santo Domingo, La Custodia, Santa Helena, Cerro Chico
- Settlements: Aquitania, Cuítiva, Iza, Tota

Lake Tota (Spanish: Lago de Tota) is the largest lake in Colombia, located in the east of Boyacá department, inside the Sugamuxi Province, it is the source of the Upia River which flows into the Orinoco River basin.

The major town on the lake is Aquitania, located on its eastern side. Other nearby villages include Tota, Iza and Cuítiva.

Lake Tota was an important religious center for the Muisca culture. The name Tota comes from the Chibcha language of the Muisca and according to linguist Mariana Escribano its main name refers to "Astronomic Observatory", relating to its sacred uses for that culture. There are legends which relate to the way the lake was formed by the hands of ancient ancestors.

The area around Lake Tota is one of the major onion producing regions of Colombia. The western shore of the lake is a popular tourist destination for Colombians.

The average water temperature of 13 °C allowed for the introduction of rainbow trout (Onchorynchus mykiss) which created a valuable wild fishery (a mounted specimen in Restaurante Lucho, Aquitania, reportedly early in the 1990s, weighed 7 kg) and cage culture aquaculture, but predation on native fish species has led to the probable extinction of the pez graso or grease fish (Rhizosomichthys totae) believed native to only this lake.

Lake Tota is a breeding ground for several threatened or endangered bird species, including the least bittern (Ixobrychus exilis bogotensis), the Colombian ruddy duck (Oxyura jamaicensis andina), the Bogotá rail (Rallus semiplumbeus) and Apolinar's wren (Cistothorus apolinari). The last confirmed sighting of the Colombian grebe (Podiceps andinus), now considered to be extinct, was at Lake Tota.

== Etymology ==
In the Chibcha language of the Muisca people, Tota means "Farmfields of the river".

== Geography ==
Lake Tota consists of an area of 55.1 square kilometres (21.3 mi^{2}) with a length of 11.8 kilometers, a width of 6.2 kilometers and a depth of 58 meters being the largest natural lake in Colombia. Recent research has documented substantial environmental change in Lake Tota since pre-colonial times; a 2024 study attributed recent degradation partly to increased nutrient inputs from agriculture and fish farming, reduction of the lake's surface area for agricultural expansion, and wastewater from Aquitania..

== Climate ==
Climate data for Lake Tota (Tunel El), elevation 3,000 m (9,800 ft), (1981–2010)
Month	Jan	Feb	Mar	Apr	May	Jun	Jul	Aug	Sep	Oct	Nov	Dec	Year
Mean daily maximum °C (°F)	16.9 (62.4)	16.8 (62.2)	17.0 (62.6)	16.3 (61.3)	15.8 (60.4)	14.9 (58.8)	14.5 (58.1)	14.5 (58.1)	15.2 (59.4)	15.7 (60.3)	16.1 (61.0)	16.6 (61.9)	15.8 (60.4)
Daily mean °C (°F)	11.6 (52.9)	11.7 (53.1)	11.8 (53.2)	11.8 (53.2)	11.8 (53.2)	11.4 (52.5)	10.9 (51.6)	10.9 (51.6)	11.2 (52.2)	11.4 (52.5)	11.6 (52.9)	11.8 (53.2)	11.5 (52.7)
Mean daily minimum °C (°F)	6.8 (44.2)	7.3 (45.1)	7.6 (45.7)	8.2 (46.8)	8.5 (47.3)	8.2 (46.8)	7.7 (45.9)	7.7 (45.9)	7.5 (45.5)	7.6 (45.7)	7.9 (46.2)	7.4 (45.3)	7.7 (45.9)
Average precipitation mm (inches)	17.1 (0.67)	30.4 (1.20)	57.2 (2.25)	95.7 (3.77)	87.8 (3.46)	70.1 (2.76)	77.9 (3.07)	58.8 (2.31)	62.5 (2.46)	87.2 (3.43)	81.4 (3.20)	23.9 (0.94)	749.9 (29.52)
Average precipitation days	4	6	11	15	18	18	20	18	16	16	14	8	159
Average relative humidity (%)	80	81	82	85	85	85	85	85	84	85	85	82	84
Mean monthly sunshine hours	241.8	183.5	167.4	132.0	139.5	129.0	139.5	130.2	132.0	145.7	156.0	213.9	1,910.5
Mean daily sunshine hours	7.8	6.5	5.4	4.4	4.5	4.3	4.5	4.2	4.4	4.7	5.2	6.9	5.2
Source: Instituto de Hidrologia Meteorologia y Estudios Ambientales

== Gallery ==
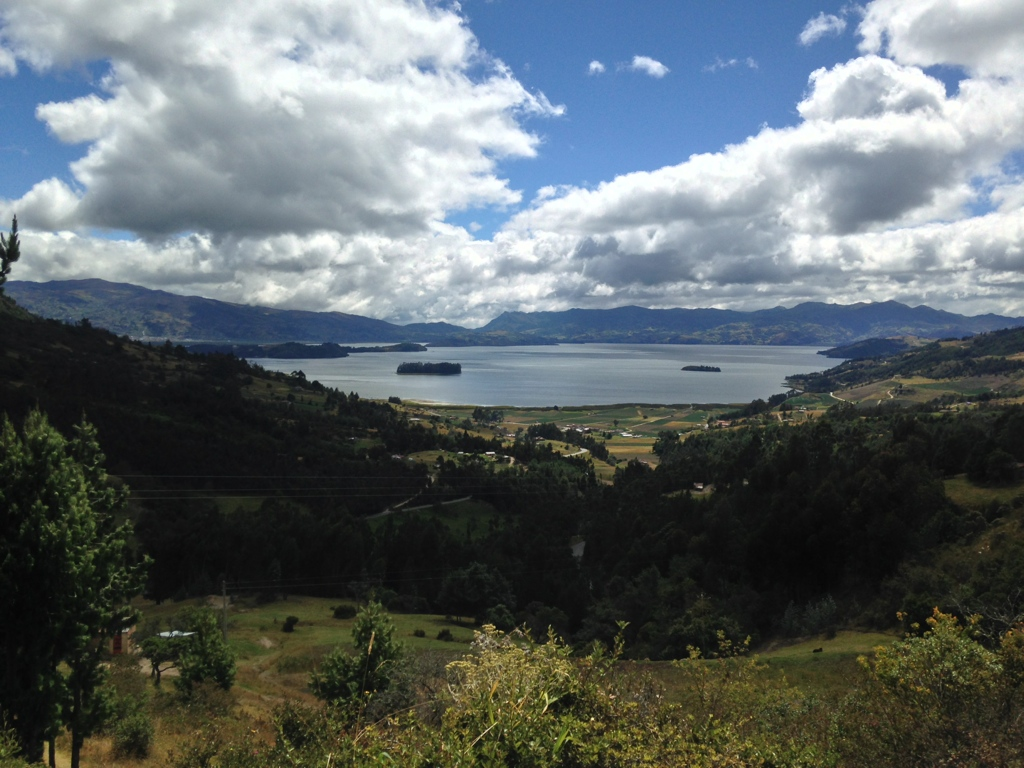
View of Lake Tota

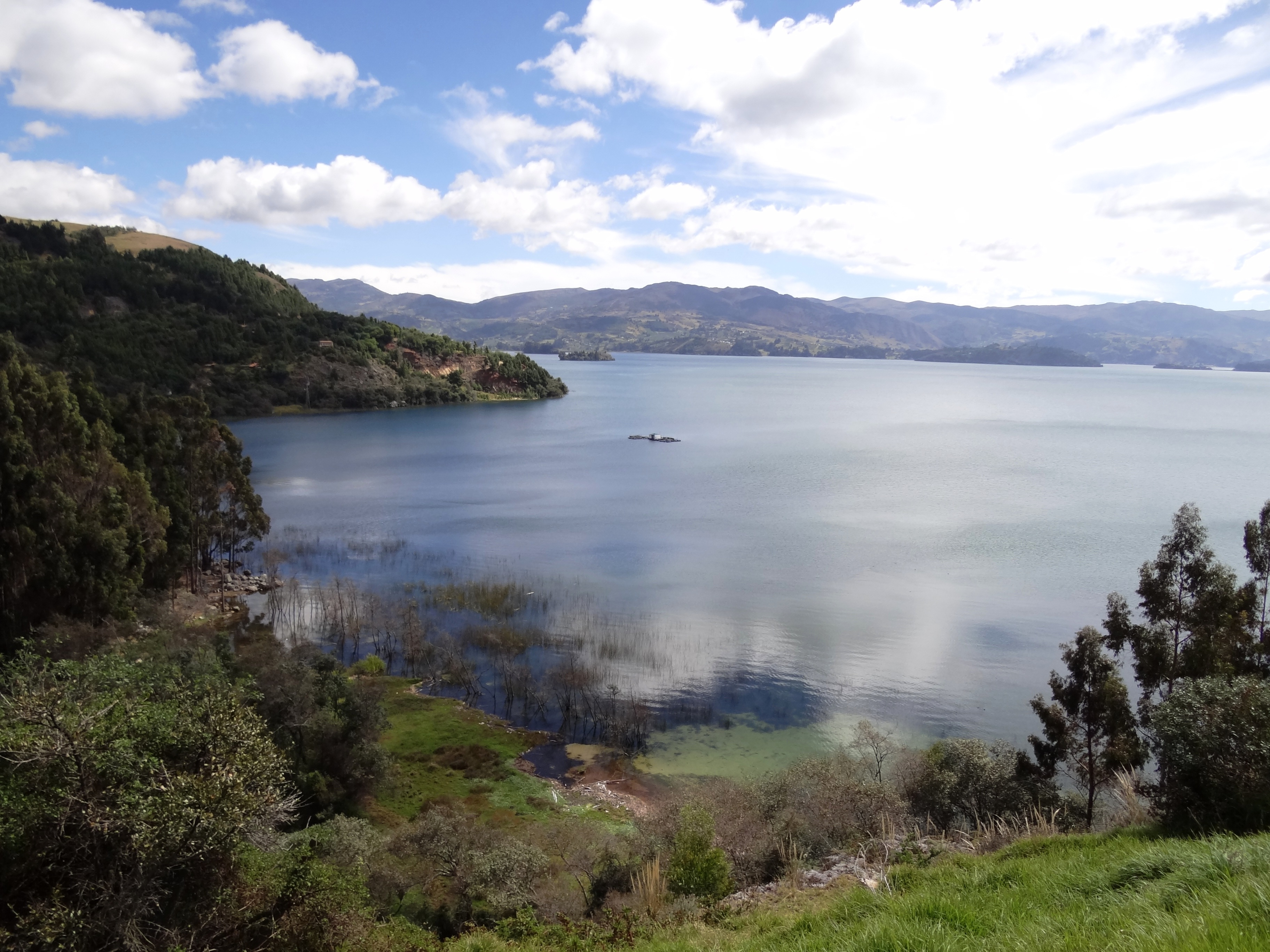
Lake Tota

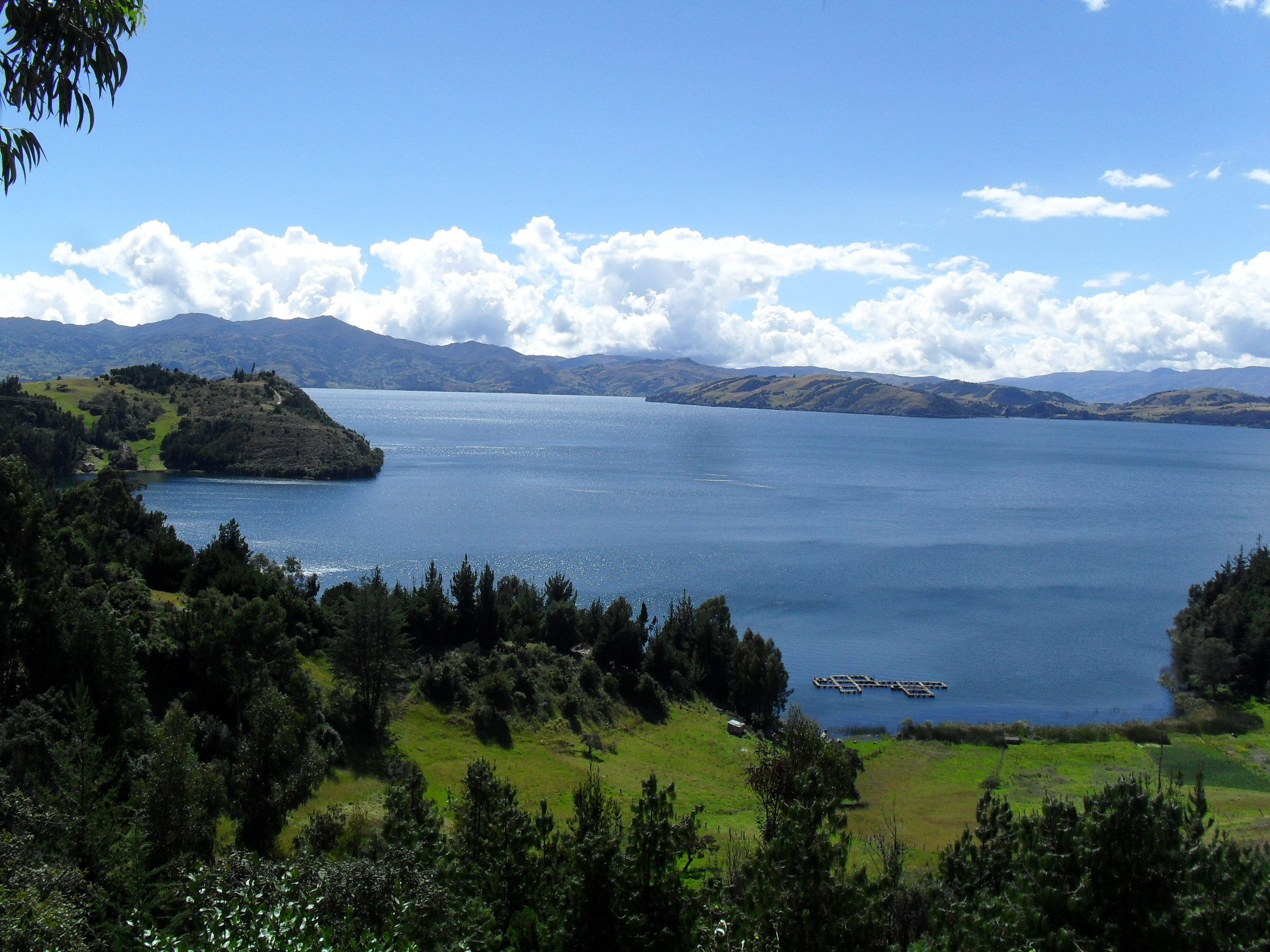
Lake Tota

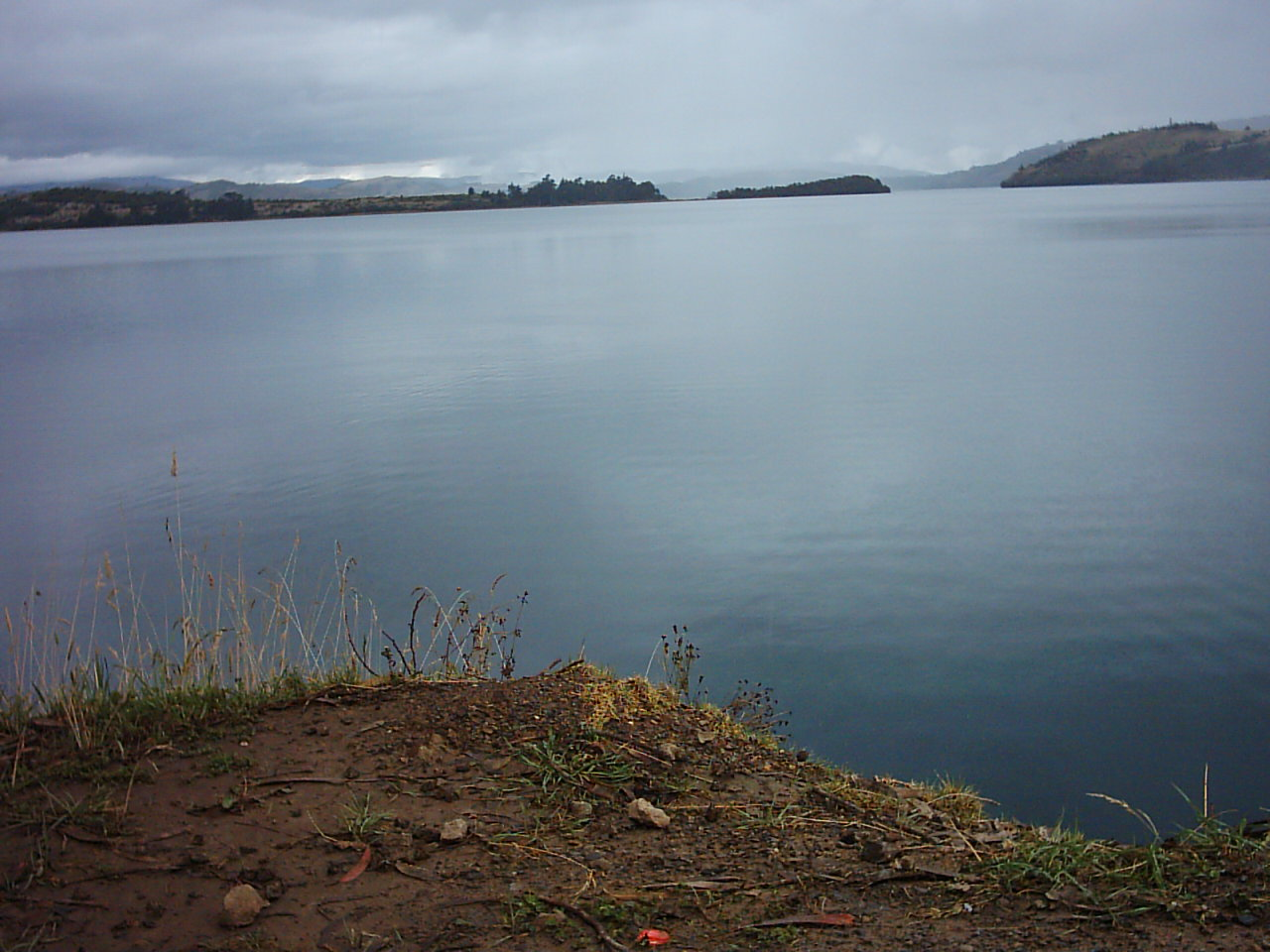
Lake Tota

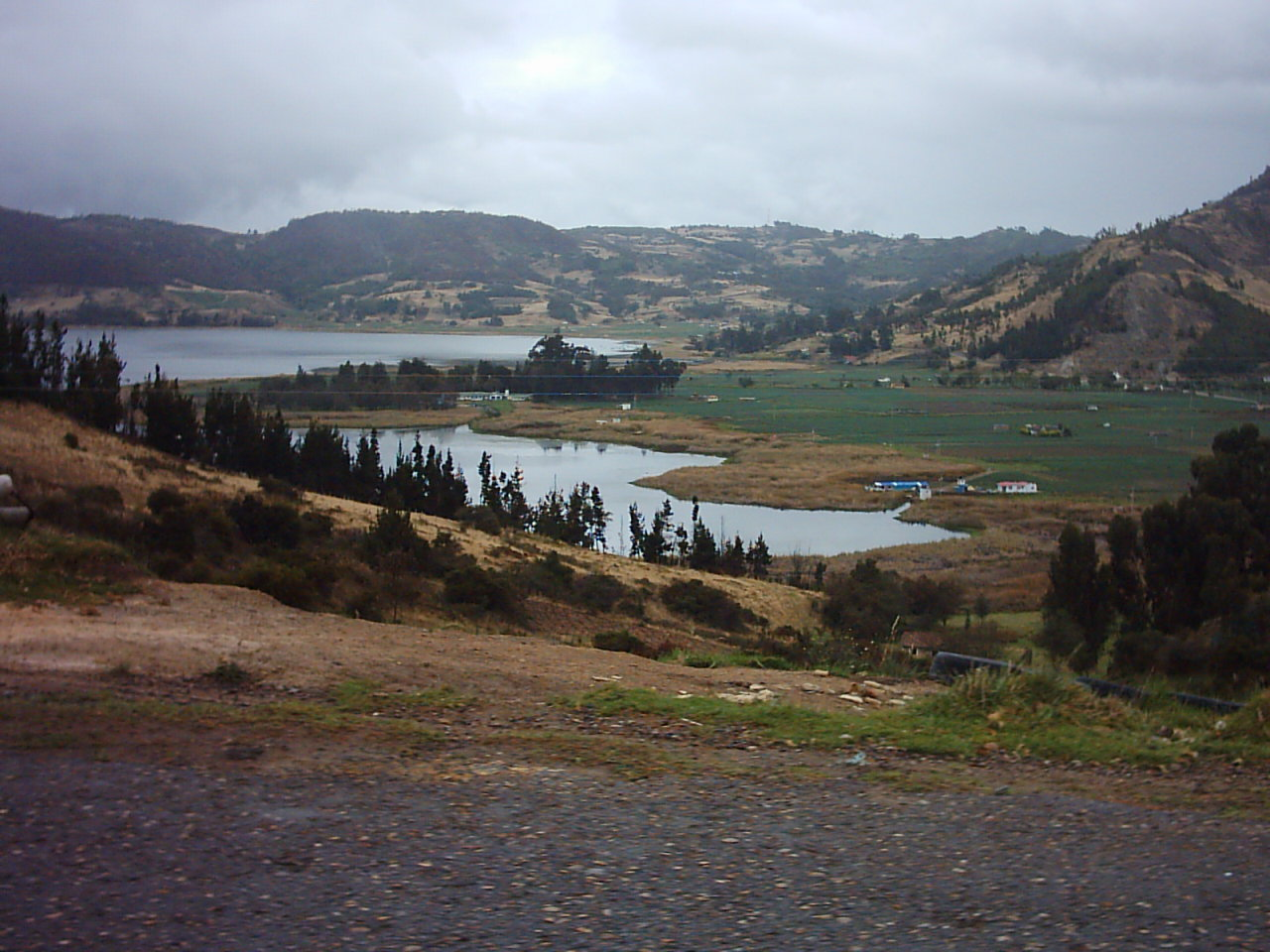
Lake Tota landscape

== See also ==
- Monster of Lake Tota
- Muisca religion
- Lake Guatavita, Lake Iguaque, Lake Suesca, Siecha Lakes
