= Lengupá River =

River in Colombia

The Lengupá is a river in the department of Boyacá, Colombia giving its name to the valley and the province it crosses. The Lengupá flows into the Upía River, which in turn flows into the Meta River, which goes east across the Llanos Orientales plains to the Orinoco.
