= Campohermoso =

Coordinates: 5°05′N 73°00′W

- Municipality and town
- Flag

- Location of the municipality and town of Campohermoso in the Boyacá Department of Colombia.
- Country: Colombia
- Department: Boyacá Department
- Province: Lengupá Province

Government
  - Mayor: Jaime Yesid Rodríguez Romero (2020-2023)

Area
  - Total: 302 km^{2} (117 sq mi)
- Elevation: 1,100 m (3,600 ft)
- Time zone: UTC-5 (Colombia Standard Time)

Campohermoso (Spanish pronunciation: [kampoeɾˈmoso]) is a town and municipality in the Colombian Department of Boyacá, part of the subregion of the Lengupá Province.

== Climate ==
Campohermoso has a tropical monsoon climate (Köppen Am) with moderate rainfall from December to March and heavy to very heavy rainfall in the remaining months.

Climate data for Campohermoso, elevation 1,300 m (4,300 ft), (1981–2010)
Month	Jan	Feb	Mar	Apr	May	Jun	Jul	Aug	Sep	Oct	Nov	Dec	Year
Mean daily maximum °C (°F)	27.1 (80.8)	27.6 (81.7)	26.8 (80.2)	26.1 (79.0)	25.3 (77.5)	24.5 (76.1)	24.0 (75.2)	24.6 (76.3)	25.9 (78.6)	26.4 (79.5)	26.2 (79.2)	26.3 (79.3)	25.9 (78.6)
Daily mean °C (°F)	21.7 (71.1)	21.9 (71.4)	21.8 (71.2)	21.2 (70.2)	20.8 (69.4)	20.3 (68.5)	19.9 (67.8)	20.2 (68.4)	20.9 (69.6)	21.4 (70.5)	21.4 (70.5)	21.4 (70.5)	21.1 (70.0)
Mean daily minimum °C (°F)	16.6 (61.9)	17.2 (63.0)	17.7 (63.9)	17.9 (64.2)	17.6 (63.7)	17.2 (63.0)	16.7 (62.1)	16.8 (62.2)	16.8 (62.2)	17.2 (63.0)	17.4 (63.3)	17.0 (62.6)	17.2 (63.0)
Average precipitation mm (inches)	45.1 (1.78)	65.0 (2.56)	128.2 (5.05)	275.2 (10.83)	431.1 (16.97)	464.0 (18.27)	451.9 (17.79)	382.0 (15.04)	269.3 (10.60)	256.5 (10.10)	205.2 (8.08)	86.7 (3.41)	3,051 (120.1)
Average precipitation days (≥ 1.0 mm)	10	11	18	25	29	29	30	29	26	26	24	15	269
Average relative humidity (%)	84	83	85	87	88	89	90	88	87	86	86	85	86
Source: Instituto de Hidrologia Meteorologia y Estudios Ambientales
