= Páez, Boyacá =

Coordinates: 5.10444°N 73.0556°W

Páez
- Municipality and town
- Flag

- Location of the municipality and town of Páez, Boyaca in the Boyacá Department of Colombia.
- Country: Colombia
- Department: Boyacá Department
- Province: Lengupá Province

Government
  - Mayor: Juan Diego Morales Calderón (2020-2023)
- Time zone: UTC-5 (Colombia Standard Time)

Páez (Spanish pronunciation: [ˈpaes]) is a town and municipality in the Colombian Department of Boyacá, part of the subregion of the Lengupá Province.

The town is named after José Antonio Páez.
