= Upía River =

Location
- Country: Colombia

Physical characteristics
- Source
  - location: Lake Tota
- Mouth
  - location: Meta River

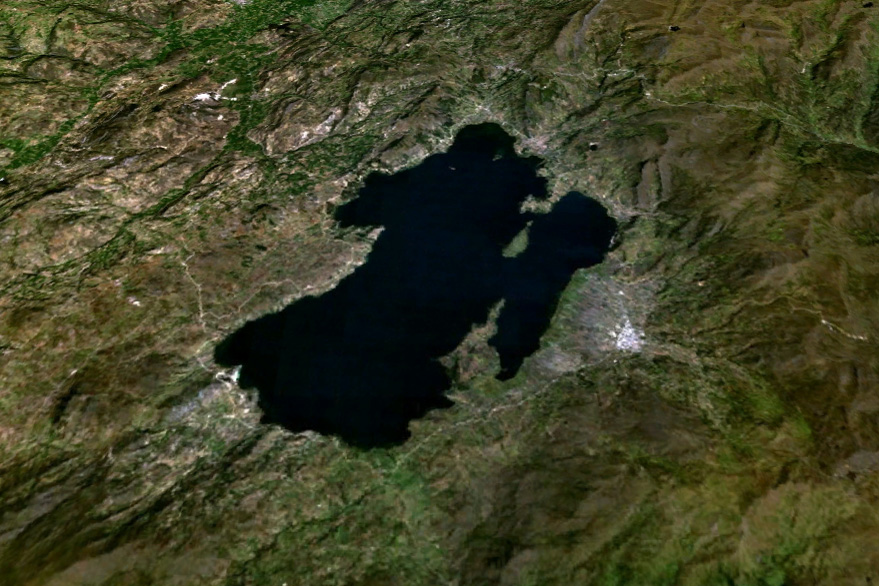
Lake Tota

Upía River, a river in Colombia originating at Lake Tota (5°29'31" N, 72°56'04" W), is a tributary of the Meta River flowing into the Orinoco River basin.

== See also ==
- List of rivers of Colombia
