= Recetor =

Coordinates: 5°14′N 72°46′W

- Municipality and town
- Location of the municipality and town of Recetor in the Casanare Department of Colombia.
- Country: Colombia
- Department: Casanare Department
- Time zone: UTC-5 (Colombia Standard Time)

Recetor is a Colombian municipality in the Department of Casanare. Its jurisdiction has an area of 182 square kilometres or 70 square miles and a population of 4,072. It is located on the eastern slope of the Colombian Andes, with an altitude of 800 metres or 2,620 feet. It has an average temperature of 22 °C or 71.6 °F.

== History ==
Recetor was founded on 17 March 1740 by Jesuit Missionaries, and was officially made into a municipality in 1925. The first colonists arrived from the department of Boyacá, coming mostly from the municipalities of Miraflores, Berbeo, Paez, and Campohermosa.

== Geography ==
Recetor has an area of 182 square kilometers, of which 0.5 square kilometres or 0.2 square miles are urban and 181.5 square kilometres or 70.1 square miles are rural. Recetor borders the department of Boyacá, to the east by the municipality of Aguazul, to the south by the municipality of Tauramena and to the southeast by the municipality of Chameza.

== Economy ==
The main economic activities are subsistence farming, basic salt mining from wells adjacent to the Recetoreno River, coal mining, and cattle breeding.
