= Chámeza =

Coordinates: 5°13′N 72°53′W

- Municipality and town
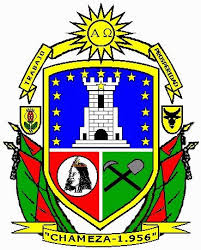
- Coat of arms

- Location of the municipality and town of Chameza in the Casanare Department of Colombia
- Country: Colombia
- Region: Andean Region
- Department: Casanare Department
- Time zone: UTC-5 (Colombia Standard Time)

Chámeza (Spanish pronunciation: [ˈtʃamesa]) is a town and municipality in the Department of Casanare, Colombia.

== Climate ==
Chámeza has a very wet tropical rainforest climate (Af).

Climate data for Chámeza
Month	Jan	Feb	Mar	Apr	May	Jun	Jul	Aug	Sep	Oct	Nov	Dec	Year
Mean daily maximum °C (°F)	28.8 (83.8)	29.2 (84.6)	28.8 (83.8)	27.8 (82.0)	27.3 (81.1)	26.1 (79.0)	26.5 (79.7)	26.6 (79.9)	26.9 (80.4)	27.2 (81.0)	27.6 (81.7)	27.9 (82.2)	27.6 (81.6)
Daily mean °C (°F)	22.7 (72.9)	23.2 (73.8)	23.2 (73.8)	22.7 (72.9)	22.5 (72.5)	21.6 (70.9)	21.6 (70.9)	21.6 (70.9)	21.7 (71.1)	22.0 (71.6)	22.4 (72.3)	22.4 (72.3)	22.3 (72.2)
Mean daily minimum °C (°F)	16.6 (61.9)	17.2 (63.0)	17.7 (63.9)	17.7 (63.9)	17.7 (63.9)	17.1 (62.8)	16.8 (62.2)	16.7 (62.1)	16.6 (61.9)	16.9 (62.4)	17.2 (63.0)	16.9 (62.4)	17.1 (62.8)
Average rainfall mm (inches)	66.5 (2.62)	83.2 (3.28)	193.6 (7.62)	446.4 (17.57)	614.2 (24.18)	716.7 (28.22)	714.1 (28.11)	519.6 (20.46)	459.9 (18.11)	473.6 (18.65)	306.9 (12.08)	125.2 (4.93)	4,719.9 (185.83)
Average rainy days	7	9	14	23	25	25	27	25	21	21	17	10	224
Source 1:
Source 2:
