= Miraflores, Boyacá =

Coordinates: 5°11′47″N 73°08′40″W

- Municipality and town
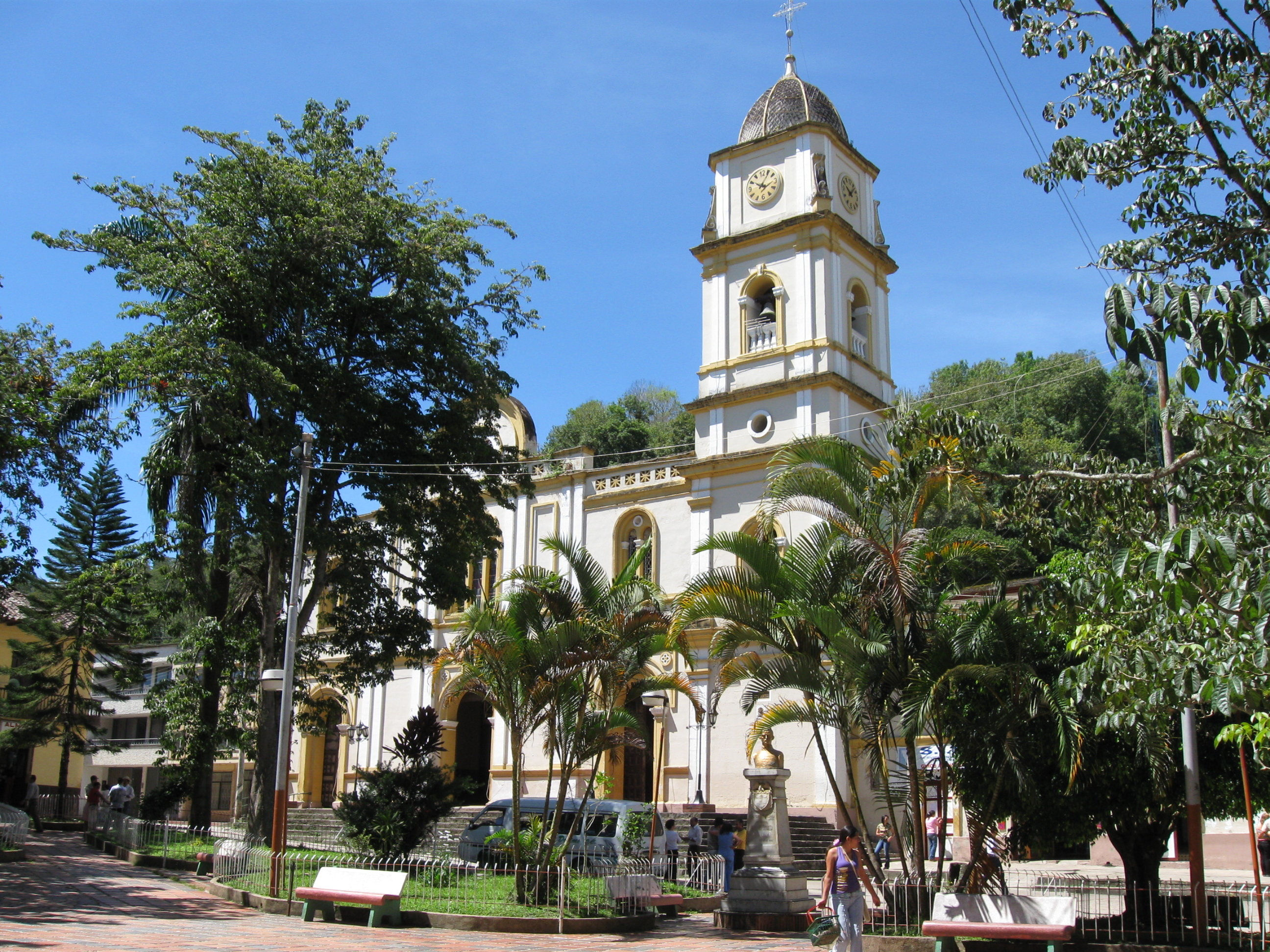
- Church

- Flag Coat of arms

- Location of the municipality and town of Miraflores, Boyacá in the Boyacá Department of Colombia.
- Country: Colombia
- Department: Boyacá Department
- Province: Lengupá Province

Government
  - Mayor: Fredy Alexander Holguín Ruíz (2020-2023)

Population (Census 2018)
  - Total: 8,274
- Time zone: UTC-5 (Colombia Standard Time)

Miraflores is a town and municipality in the Colombian Department of Boyacá, part of the subregion of the Lengupá Province.

Miraflores has been the site of the ocobos (Tree)

== Climate ==
Climate data for Miraflores (Vivero El), elevation 1,640 m (5,380 ft), (1981–2010)
Month	Jan	Feb	Mar	Apr	May	Jun	Jul	Aug	Sep	Oct	Nov	Dec	Year
Mean daily maximum °C (°F)	25.3 (77.5)	26.2 (79.2)	25.8 (78.4)	24.8 (76.6)	24.0 (75.2)	22.8 (73.0)	22.2 (72.0)	22.2 (72.0)	23.8 (74.8)	24.3 (75.7)	24.3 (75.7)	24.6 (76.3)	24.1 (75.4)
Daily mean °C (°F)	19.1 (66.4)	19.6 (67.3)	19.6 (67.3)	19.4 (66.9)	18.9 (66.0)	18.2 (64.8)	17.8 (64.0)	17.8 (64.0)	18.4 (65.1)	18.8 (65.8)	18.9 (66.0)	18.9 (66.0)	18.8 (65.8)
Mean daily minimum °C (°F)	14.2 (57.6)	14.7 (58.5)	15.0 (59.0)	15.1 (59.2)	14.7 (58.5)	14.4 (57.9)	14.1 (57.4)	14.2 (57.6)	14.2 (57.6)	14.5 (58.1)	14.6 (58.3)	14.5 (58.1)	14.4 (57.9)
Average precipitation mm (inches)	23.0 (0.91)	32.3 (1.27)	72.1 (2.84)	136.9 (5.39)	218.5 (8.60)	252.9 (9.96)	252.0 (9.92)	221.9 (8.74)	153.7 (6.05)	135.7 (5.34)	104.9 (4.13)	52.6 (2.07)	1,626.2 (64.02)
Average precipitation days (≥ 1.0 mm)	6	10	14	21	26	27	28	27	22	22	19	11	228
Average relative humidity (%)	84	81	84	87	89	91	92	91	88	88	88	86	88
Source: Instituto de Hidrologia Meteorologia y Estudios Ambientales
