= San Eduardo, Boyacá =

Coordinates: 5°13′21″N 73°04′37″W

San Eduardo, Boyaca
- Municipality and town
- Flag

- Location of the municipality and town of San Eduardo, Boyaca in the Boyacá Department of Colombia.
- Country: Colombia
- Department: Boyacá Department
- Province: Lengupá Province

Government
  - Mayor: Miguel Antonio Mora Vallejo (2020-2023)
- Time zone: UTC-5 (Colombia Standard Time)

San Eduardo (Spanish pronunciation: [san eðuˈaɾðo]) is a town and municipality in the Colombian Department of Boyacá, part of the subregion of the Lengupá Province.
