= Firavitoba =

- Municipality and town
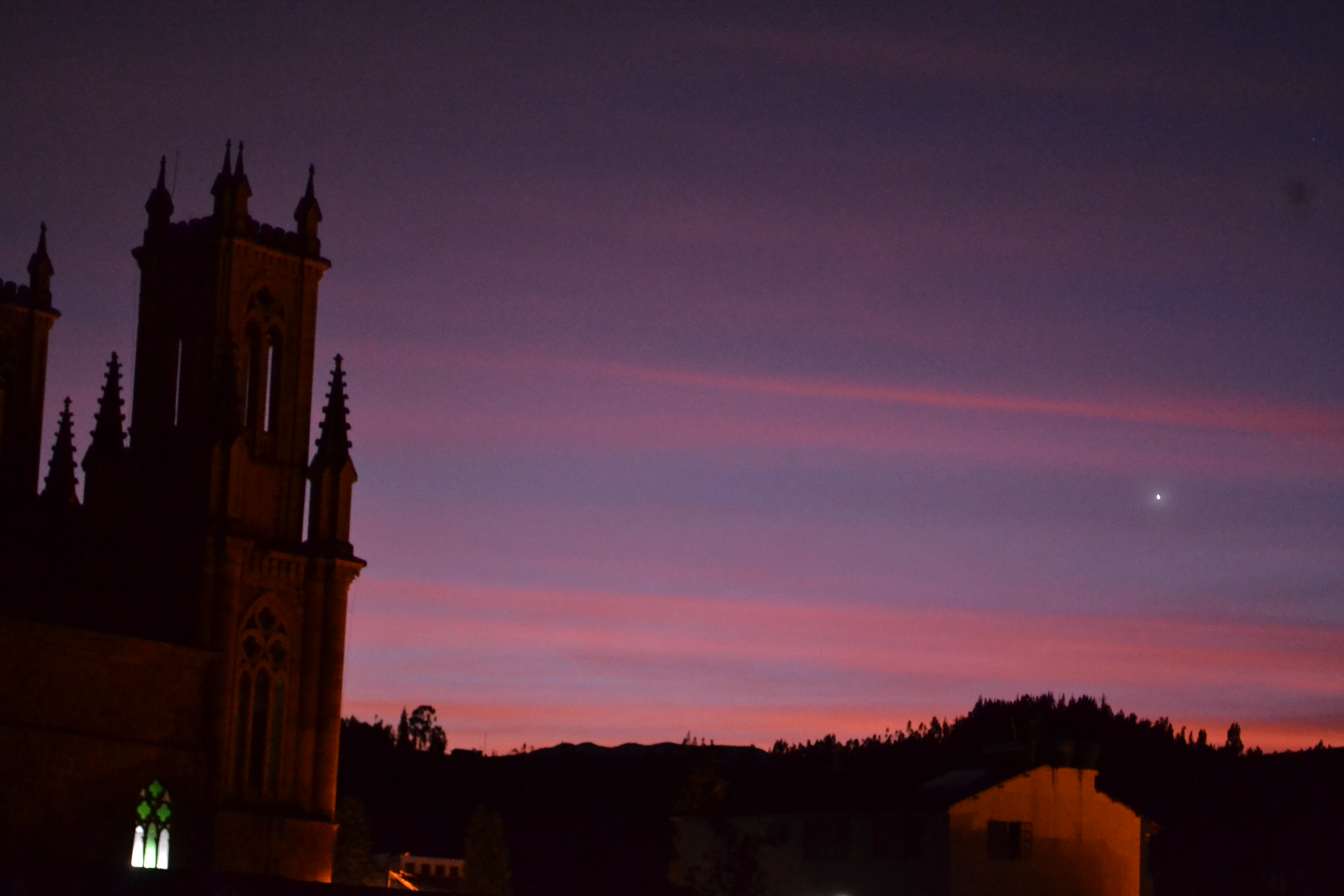
- Twilight over Firavitoba

- Flag Coat of arms

- Location of the municipality and town of Firavitoba in the Boyacá Department of Colombia
- Coordinates: 5°40′10″N 72°59′37″W
- Country: Colombia
- Department: Boyacá Department
- Province: Sugamuxi Province
- Founded: There is no fixed date 1634 - 1781

Government
  - Mayor: Emiliano Alfonso Chaparro Fonseca (2020–2023)

Area
  - Total: 109.9 km^{2} (42.4 sq mi)
- Elevation: 2,490 m (8,170 ft)

Population
  - Total: 5,730
  - Density: 52.1/km^{2} (135/sq mi)
- Time zone: UTC-5 (Colombia Standard Time)
- Website: Official website

Firavitoba is a town and municipality in Sugamuxi Province, a subregion of the department of Boyacá in Colombia.

Before Spanish colonization, Firavitoba was part of the Muisca Confederation of the Chibcha people in the highlands of the Eastern Cordillera of the Colombian Andes. Firavitoba belonged to the Iraca or Suamox state which, uniquely, did not observe a hereditary leadership system but elected its ruler alternately from Firavitoba and Tobasá, two of its many tribes.

Firavitoba is distinguished by its neo-Gothic church, the third biggest in Colombia. Nuestra Señora de las Nieves (Our Lady of the Snows) was built between 1873 and 1976, entirely of stone sourced from nearby Sogamoso's Pedregal district.

== Etymology ==
The name Firavitoba derives from the Muysccubun language of the Muisca people. One etymology gives the root words as fiba ("air"), and faoa ("clouds").

== Geography ==
Firavitoba is located on the Altiplano Cundiboyacense, at an altitude of 2,490 metres (8,170 ft) metres above sea level (m a.s.l.). It borders the municipalities of Paipa and Tibasosa in the north, Iza and Pesca in the south, Sogamoso in the east, and Tuta and Toca to the west. It covers an area of 109.9 square kilometres (42.4 sq mi), in part on the plains and in part mountainous. Its highest point is the hill of Guática, at 3,228 metres (10,591 ft) a.s.l. It is bounded by the Chiquito River, one of the tributaries of the Chicamocha River.

Firavitoba is seventy-seven kilometres (48 mi) from the departmental capital of Tunja, and ten kilometres (6 mi) from the provincial capital, Sogamoso.

== History ==
=== Pre-Columbian period ===
The original, lakeside-dwelling inhabitants of the territory may have been the Chibchan-speaking Arhuaco people, according to Spanish archaeologist José Pérez de Barradas. Tribal migrations had slowed and settlement had been stable in the area for some time prior to the arrival of the Spaniards. The local community had organized its social structure around a hilltop site subdivided into a number districts that provided multiple vantage points. This settlement, Guática, "song of the fenced the mountain", later became the town of Firavitoba.

The Muisca, also a Chibcha people, arrived in the central highlands of the Colombian Andes, the Altiplano Cundiboyacense, in the ninth or tenth century. They came up into the mountains from the Llanos Orientales, or Eastern Plains of the Orinoquía region. The early Spanish chronicler, the bishop Lucas Fernández de Piedrahita, believed that the Muisca Confederation of the highlands originally founded its state in the eleventh or twelfth centuries, centred on Hunza, capital of the ruler Hunzahúa, now the city of Tunja.

Some seventy years before the arrival of the Spaniards, the Altiplano region had separated into four independent Muisca states: Hunza, Bacatá, Tundama, and Iraca or Suamox (present day Sogamoso). Each state comprised a number of tribes, which formed its primary administrative and territorial units. These tribes, brought together by cultural affinity, geographic proximity or shared military and defensive interests, organized under a common legal and political framework and sovereign leadership. Of the two principal states in the Muisca's Altiplano territory at the time of the Spanish conquest one, in its southern area with its ceremonial capital in Bacatá (now Bogotá), was ruled by a high priest called the zipa, and the other was in its northern area, and ruled by the zaque from Hunza.

Firavitoba was a tribe and settlement of Iraca or Suamox, the smallest of the four states, whose high priest and leader was the iraca or sogamuxi. Uniquely among the Chibcha states, it did not observe the usual hereditary leadership structure of succession by the ruler's nephew, oldest son of his oldest sister. Instead the iraca was elected by a council comprising the caciques of four of its twenty main tribes, the Pesca, Toca, Gámeza and Busbanzá. If the election process failed to achieve a result, the cacique (or tundama) of the Tundama tribe also voted. Tradition held that the sovereign ruler was to be elected from the settlements of Firavitoba and Tobasá alone, in strict alternation and to the exclusion of all other population centres. This custom continued until the Spanish conquest.

=== Spanish colonization ===
Six expeditions by Spanish conquistadors led to the founding of the New Kingdom of Granada over much of the territory of modern Colombia, Venezuela and Panama. It was the exploratory expedition led by Gonzalo Jiménez de Quesada which rapidly overcame the Muisca states of the Altiplano and colonized the region. Jiménez de Quesada departed on April 5, 1536, from Santa Marta, on behalf of its governor Pedro Fernández de Lugo, leading a mainly military force of some 600 land troops and several hundred sailors manning brigantines for river navigation. The third stage of the land route took them up the Cordillera Oriental of the Andes into Muisca territory. The expedition suffered heavy losses from disease, and several times stopped for periods of weeks or months to rest and regain strength along the way.

By 1537 they had explored as far as the site of the future city of Bogotá and the beginning of the eastern plains (Llanos Orientales) of the Orinoco watershed, covering much of the Muisca's Altiplano territory, including its salt and emerald mining areas. By August 1537 they had seized the treasure of the Tunja zaque, a month later they conquered Suamox, and shortly after that killed the Bacatá zipa and his successor. While the chroniclers of the rapid conquest and colonization of the region did not record the wars against its inhabitants, or the mistreatment of their rulers, in great detail, archival documents held in Seville and Bogotá trace the course of events. It is known that many caciques were tortured, the leader of Firavitoba among them.

=== New Kingdom of Granada ===
The 1536-1538 expedition led by Gonzalo Jiménez de Quesada founded the city of Santa Fé de Bogotá (Bogotá) and gave the name El Nuevo Reino de Granada, the New Kingdom of Granada, to the region. The Royal Audiencia of the New Kingdom of Granada was established in Santa Fé de Bogotá in 1549. Its governor was dependent on the Viceroyalty of Peru in Lima.

In 1547, one of the soldiers of the German adventurer Nikolaus Federmann, Luis de Sanabria, had been granted administrative responsibility over the territories of Firavitoba, Cormechoque and Sichacá in the form of an encomienda, so becoming the first encomendero over the communities there.

His successor was Martín de Rojas, who assumed the role on marrying his daughter, Catalina de Sanabria y Macías, in 1577. The office passed to their son, Gerónimo Donato de Rojas y Sanabria. It was inherited by his son in turn. This son, Gerónimo de Rojas y Niño, married Josefa de Fonseca y Alarcón in 1629, but conflict quickly developed with her maternal relatives, among them Tota encomendero Pedro de Alarcón. This came to a head at a gathering in Tota of local encomenderos on the occasion of the visit of Royal Audiencia judge (oidor) Juan de Valcárcel to the region in 1636; Gerónimo de Rojas was ambushed and murdered in nearby Iza by several brothers of de Alarcón. His son, Martín de Rojas y Fonseca, took over the encomienda of Firavitoba.

Tunja was one of the main centres of a first cycle of gold production in the region, from 1550 to around 1620. The gold-mining workforce came essentially from the indigenous population.

The municipality of Firavitoba had the status of indigenous village (village of Indians) or religious district (head of doctrine), with a chaplaincy founded in 1633 by Catalina de Rojas and Sanabria.

The last encomendero of Firavitoba, Lorenzo de Rojas, gifted several large buildings on the main square of Tunja, and his own large estate (hacienda), to the Society of Jesus in 1661. Situated between Firavitoba and Iza, this Jesuit estate of over 300 fanegadas (1 fanegada = 6,400 m^{2}, 0.64 ha, or 1.6 acres) was known as the Hacienda La Compañía, Firavitoba or de Sogamoso.

=== Viceroyalty of New Granada ===
In May 1717, the Spanish Crown established the independent Viceroyalty of New Granada, with jurisdiction over the territories of modern Colombia, Ecuador, Panama and Venezuela. Its administrative centre and audiencia were in Bogotá, which joined Lima and Mexico City as a major seat of Spanish authority in the New World. A second cycle of gold production in the region, from 1680 to 1820, was focused principally on departments of Chocó and Antioquia, rather than on earlier centres such as Tunja.

The original church of Firavitoba was destroyed in a disaster the details which are no longer known. It may have burnt down. It was refounded in 1718 with the name Nuestra Señora de las Nieves.

Until 1729, only baptismal registers exist for Firavitoba. The first recorded entry was signed by the priest Francisco Antonio Velez Ladrón de Guevara. The first pastoral visit recorded in the books was made by Antonio Claudio Álvarez de Quiñones, Archbishop of Santa Fé de Bogotá, in 1730.

The Jesuits occupied the Hacienda La Compañia estate in Firavitoba until their expulsion from the possessions of the Spanish crown in the Americas and the Philippines in 1767. It was then subdivided and sold, but sections of walls of the old estate remain.

In 1781, the encomienda came to an end when Firavitoba was granted the higher status of parish (parroquia), with a mayor and a priest in residence. The indigenous inhabitants were transferred to Nobsa to serve out the remainder of their encomienda obligations, but were returned before the popular uprising against the Spanish authorities in the Viceroyalty of New Granada known as the Revolt of the Comuneros, from May through October of that year, although they lost some of their land.

=== Independence ===
Several years after the revolt and Colombian Declaration of Independence on July 20, 1810, in Santa Fé de Bogotá came the Spanish reconquest of New Granada in 1815–1816, under General Pablo Morillo. In 1816, the priest in Firavitoba, Carlos Suarez, was imprisoned for preaching freedom. The liberation campaign of 1819 peaked with the battles of Vargas Swamp, at Paipa, very close to Firavitoba, and of Puente de Boyacá (The Bridge of Boyaca), at which Firavitoba freedom fighter Cayetano Avella was killed. These two battles led to the full independence of New Granada and the creation of Gran Colombia in August, 1819. Gran Colombia was dissolved in 1830, with the region becoming part of the Republic of New Granada, formed in November 1831.

Although several public primary schools were established in Firavitoba before 1832, during the Republican era the importance of the municipality diminished and it passed largely unremarked in national affairs. Earthquakes in 1826 and 1827 caused serious damage to the church, but the local governmental authorities did little to make repairs.

In 1869, a new parish priest arrived in Firavitoba, and the situation began to improve. Father Ignacio Ramón Avella proposed the building of a new and imposing church in the town, Nuestra Señora de las Nieves (Our Lady of the Snows). It was to be based on the model he had brought back from Paris of a European church, and built of stone carted from the Pedregal district of Sogamoso.

Construction began four years later in 1873, and was carried out under his personal direction. Deep foundations were dug and laid. When the time came for the raising of the walls, most of Firatoba's residents participated in a day-long expedition to fetch material for the scaffolding, crossing Lake Tota to the village of Bogüita for the timbers.

=== 20th century ===
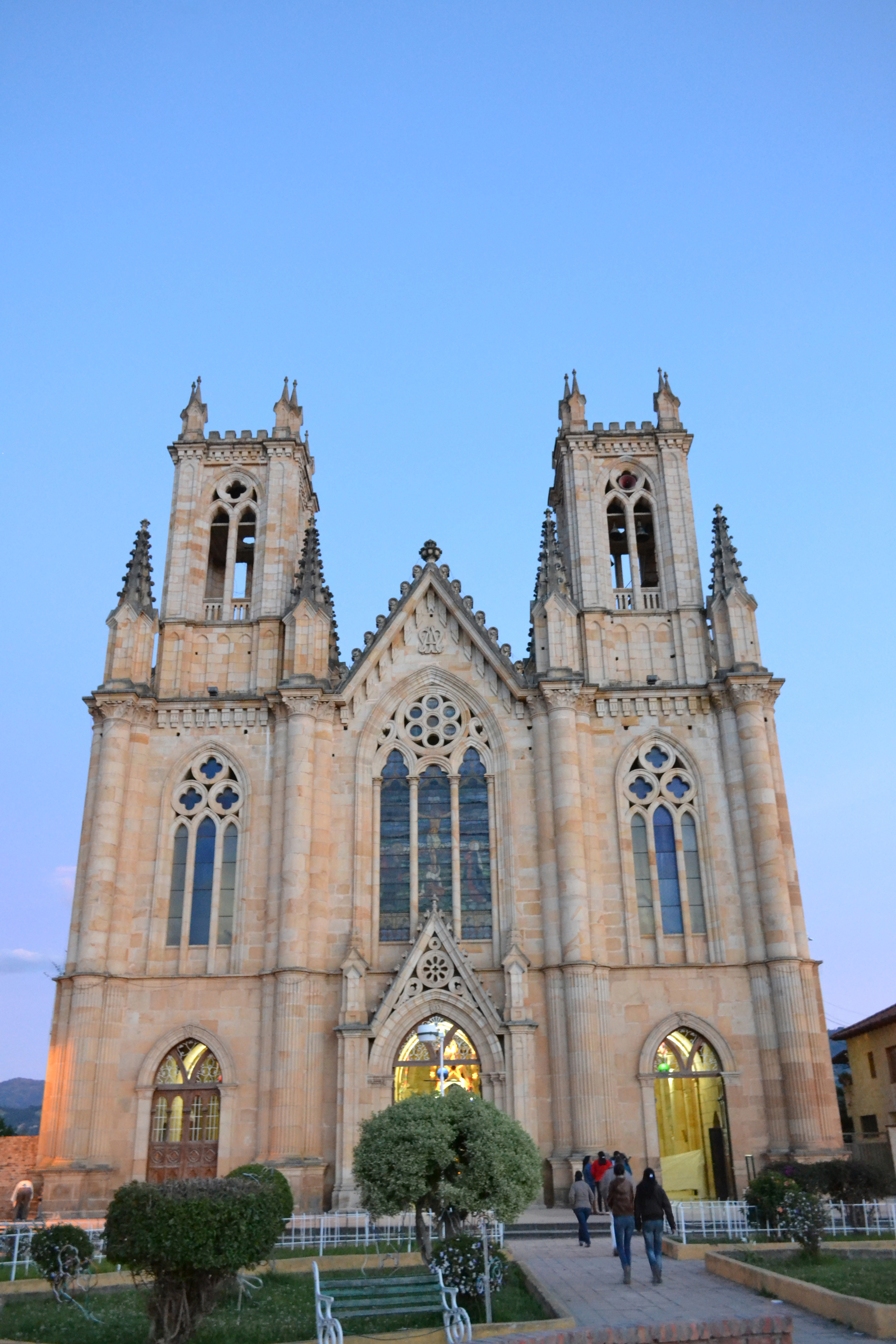
Nuestra Señora de las Nieves, Firavitoba

==== Nuestra Señora de las Nieves ====
Father Ignacio Ramón Avella died in 1901, and was much mourned in Firavitoba.

The church was still under construction but the original model had been lost, complicating progress. Work languished until 1916, when the priest Luis Abdénago Zambrano arrived in Firavitoba. He commissioned a new design, from Father Hugo Orjuela, and work resumed under the direction of Gregorio Gómez.

1937 saw completion of the church roof, providing protection for the finished back and side walls. Construction of the facade had been postponed by order of the bishop of Tunja, Crisanto Luque Sánchez, until the roof was in place. Work on the facade then progressed without further interruption. The north tower of the church was finished in 1946, and the south tower in 1949, completing the exterior of the church. Work then focused on the interior of the church, Luis Alberto Molano supervising installation of the central altar.

Firavitoba's church was officially completed in 1976, just over one hundred years after work began. The consecration of Nuestra Señora de las Nieves was performed by the Archbishop of Tunja, Augusto Trujillo Arango. It is the third largest church in Colombia, built entirely of stone in the neo-Gothic style, and is a main feature of the municipality.

==== Other key events ====
The arrival of the telegraph in Firavitoba in 1919, and of the public telephone in 1926, facilitated communication with other regions. Running water was connected to homes in 1929, and the road to Sogamoso was completed in 1933.

After many interruptions, the Paipa road running through the Vargas Swamp was completed in 1951, just over twenty years after roadworks began.

The Pro-Luz Company of Firavitoba was established at the beginning of 1953 to install electric lighting in the municipality, successfully implementing a project that dated back to 1936.

In 1962, the national Minister of Health and other government figures came to Firavitoba for the laying of the foundation stone of the clinic, on the southwestern side of the School Concentration. It was built with the support of the American government.

On December 2, 1962, the Municipal Council adopted the official flag and coat of arms of Firavitoba. The flag is green with a diagonal stripe from bottom left to top right in the yellow, blue and red of the Colombian flag. The coat of arms is a green shield with a golden cathedral representing the town through the church of Our Lady of the Snows. Two gold and green interlaced ears of wheat top the shield, the same motif repeating around its blue border to symbolize fertility of the land and agriculture in the municipality. The shield is flanked by four flags of Firavitoba, two on each side, symbolizing its patriotic citizens.

In 1963, the secondary school curriculum leading to the qualification of bachiller was introduced in Firavitoba, with the first students graduating in 1973.

In 1965, the sewer system was built through the streets of the town.

In 1985, a proposal to pipe water from Lake Tota to the municipality was negotiated. The inhabitants of Firavitoba participated in community action to contribute 1,000 pesos towards compensation costs for the water transfer.

June 1988 marked the first mayoral election in Firavitoba. Initially every two years, the election is now held every four years. The mayor's term of office begins on January 1.

At the beginning of 1989, land was granted to national telecommunications company Telecom on the site of a demolished children's school north of the main square, to build local headquarters. This was intended to facilitate rollout of the municipal telephone network, a project planned since 1978.

On January 19, 1995, a powerful earthquake struck the department of Boyacá. In Firavitoba, both towers of the church of Nuestra Señora de las Nieves were badly damaged. Reconstruction work began that same year and continued until 2000. The local community organized fundraising events, which included two festivals, two bazaars, and a beauty contest, and several companies and individuals also made donations. These efforts raised some 30 million pesos towards the cost of reconstruction. The total cost of work was anticipated in 1999 to be 180 million pesos.

=== 21st Century ===
In 2005, work began under government contract to surface the Firavitoba-Vargas Swamp road which, if completed, would link to Paipa and reduce travel distance to Tunja. In the same year, the mayors of Sogamoso, Iza and Firavitoba signed a contract with the Sugamuxi Consortium to repair and improve the road connecting the three municipalities, replacing an earlier contract with another consortium that had run into difficulty. The project was for the paving of the road to a width of 7 metres (23 ft), at a cost of over 3.5 billion pesos.

In 2012, a new municipal library was purpose-built in the town. It was inaugurated by the national Ministry of Culture on December 11 of that year. Its 300 square metres (3,200 sq ft) provide a general area with bookshelves, reading tables for adults, computers, and a special zone for children, as well as bathrooms for adults and children and facilities compliant with regulatory requirements for people with disabilities.

In 2015, after renovation works, a park on the site of Firavitoba's first Dominican church was inaugurated in honor of Sister Gabriela de San Martín, founder of the Dominican Community of Saint Catherine of Siena, who was born at the Jesuit Hacienda de la Compañía on May 22, 1848.

In 2017, repair work began some of Firatoba's streets, and four-lane road-widening work was completed. New rainwater drains were built, repairing damage that had been done to the old sewage system during works in 2015.

== Economy ==
The main economic activity of Firavitoba is livestock farming for beef and dairy production. Crop growing is the second most important sector of the local economy, mainly producing potato, wheat, corn, beans, peas, and barley, with other vegetables produced on a smaller scale. The principal activity in the mining sector is limestone quarrying for cement production.

== Airport ==
The small airport serving Sogamoso, Alberto Lleras Camargo Airport (IATA-code: SOX), is located within the municipality Firavitoba.

== Gallery ==
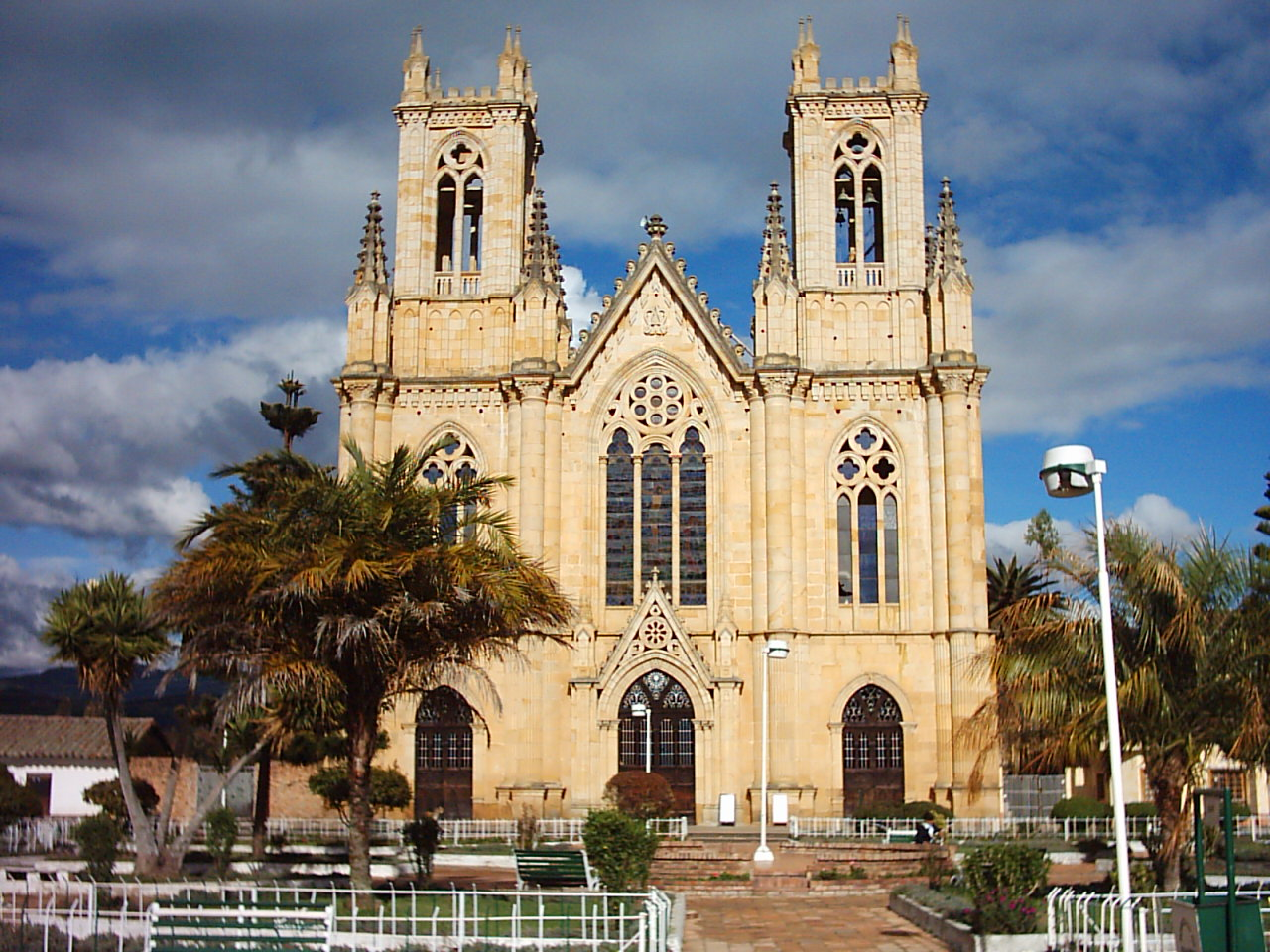
Nuestra Señora de las Nieves, Firavitoba

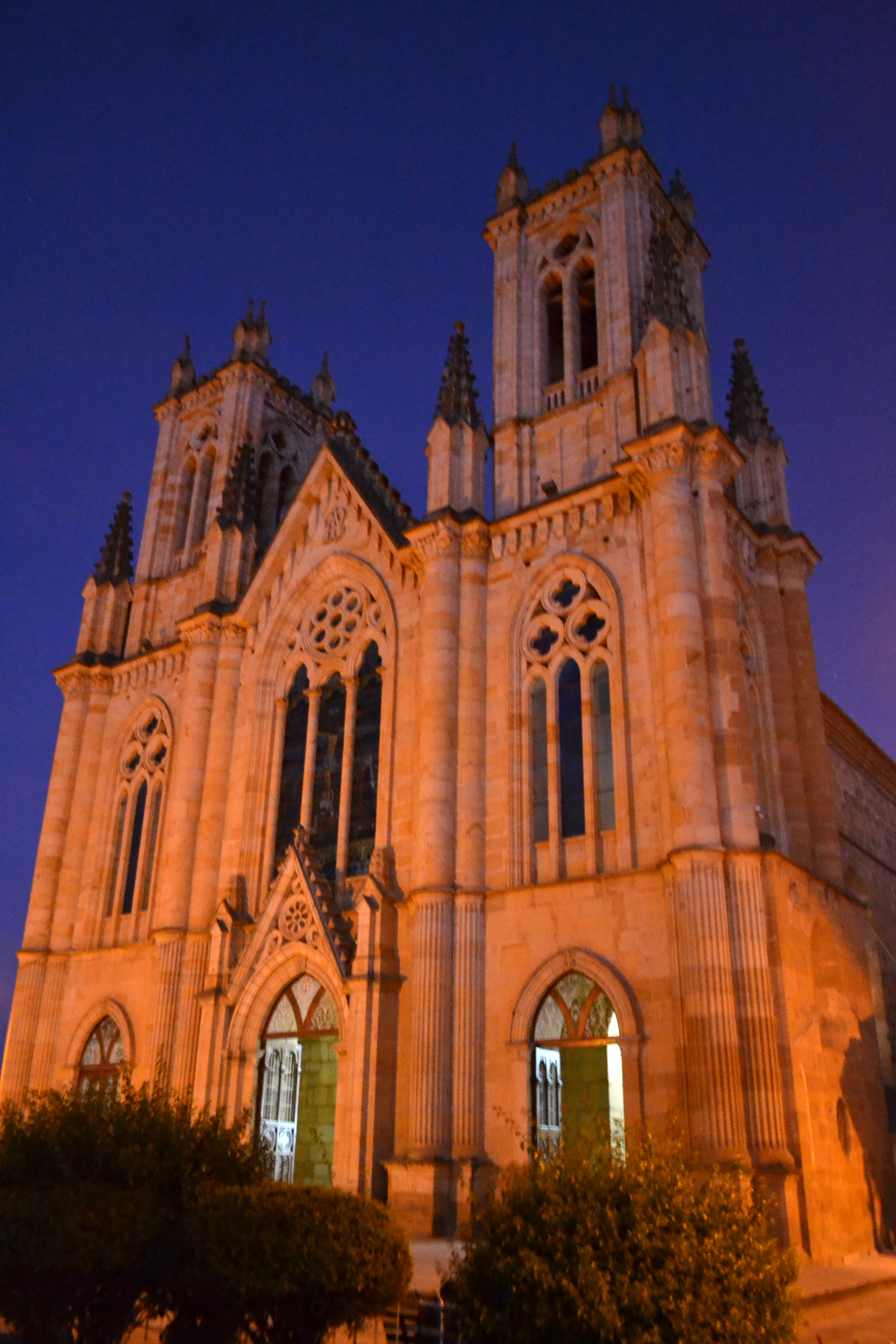
Nuestra Señora de las Nieves, Firavitoba

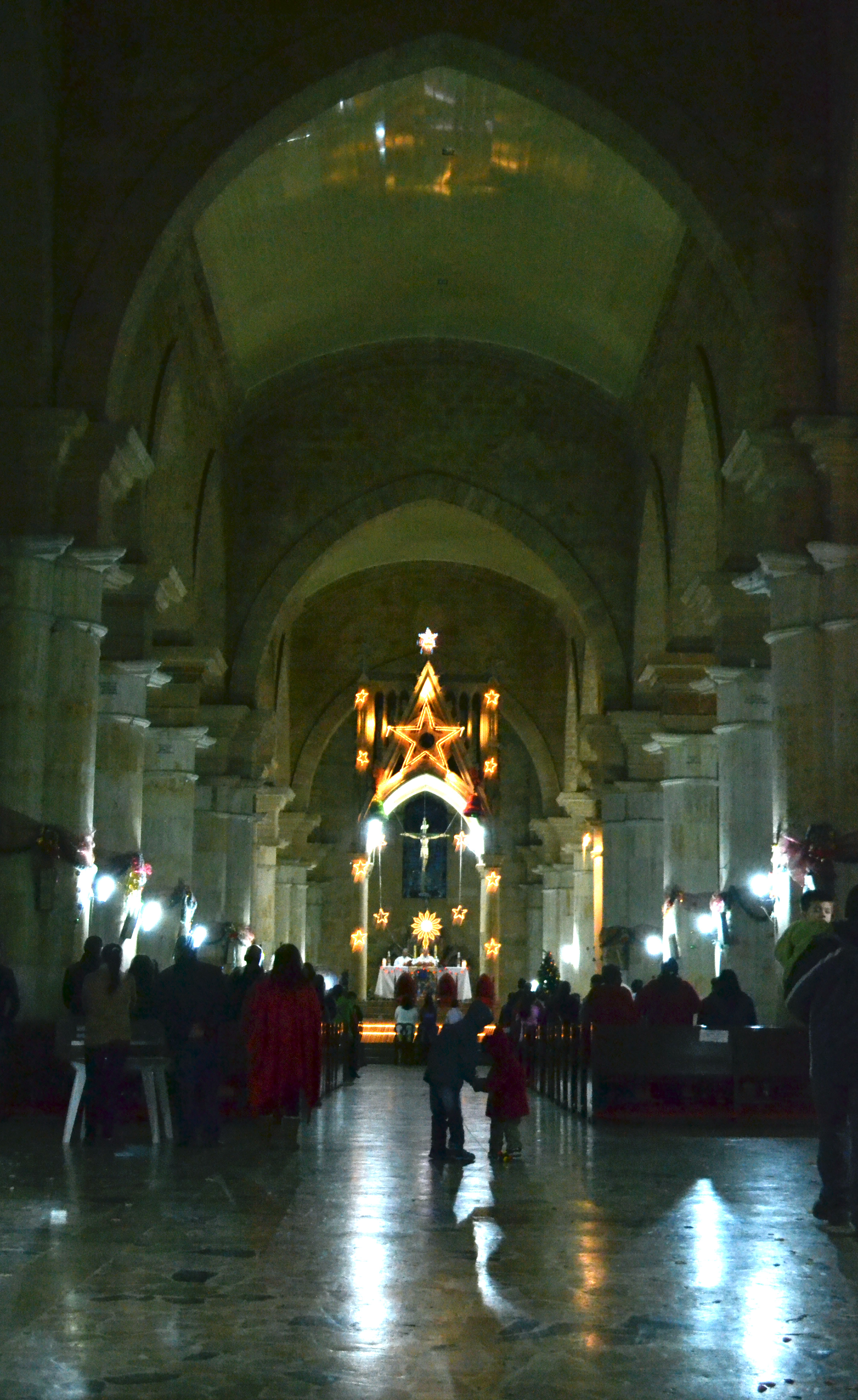
Interior, Nuestra Señora de las Nieves, Firavitoba

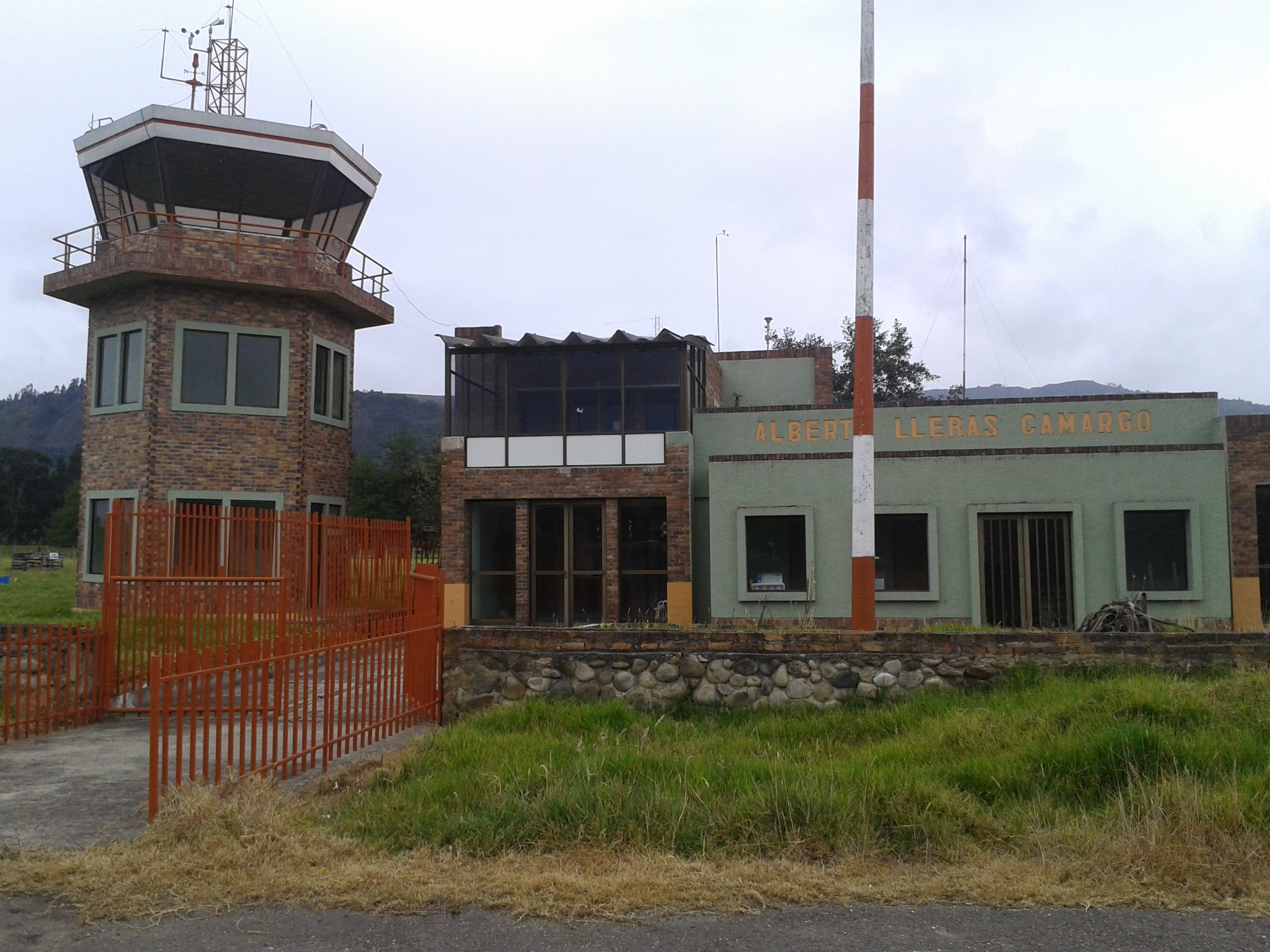
Airport "Alberto Lleras Camargo" of Sogamoso, located in Firavitoba
