= Tópaga =

Coordinates: 5°46′N 72°50′W

- Municipality and town
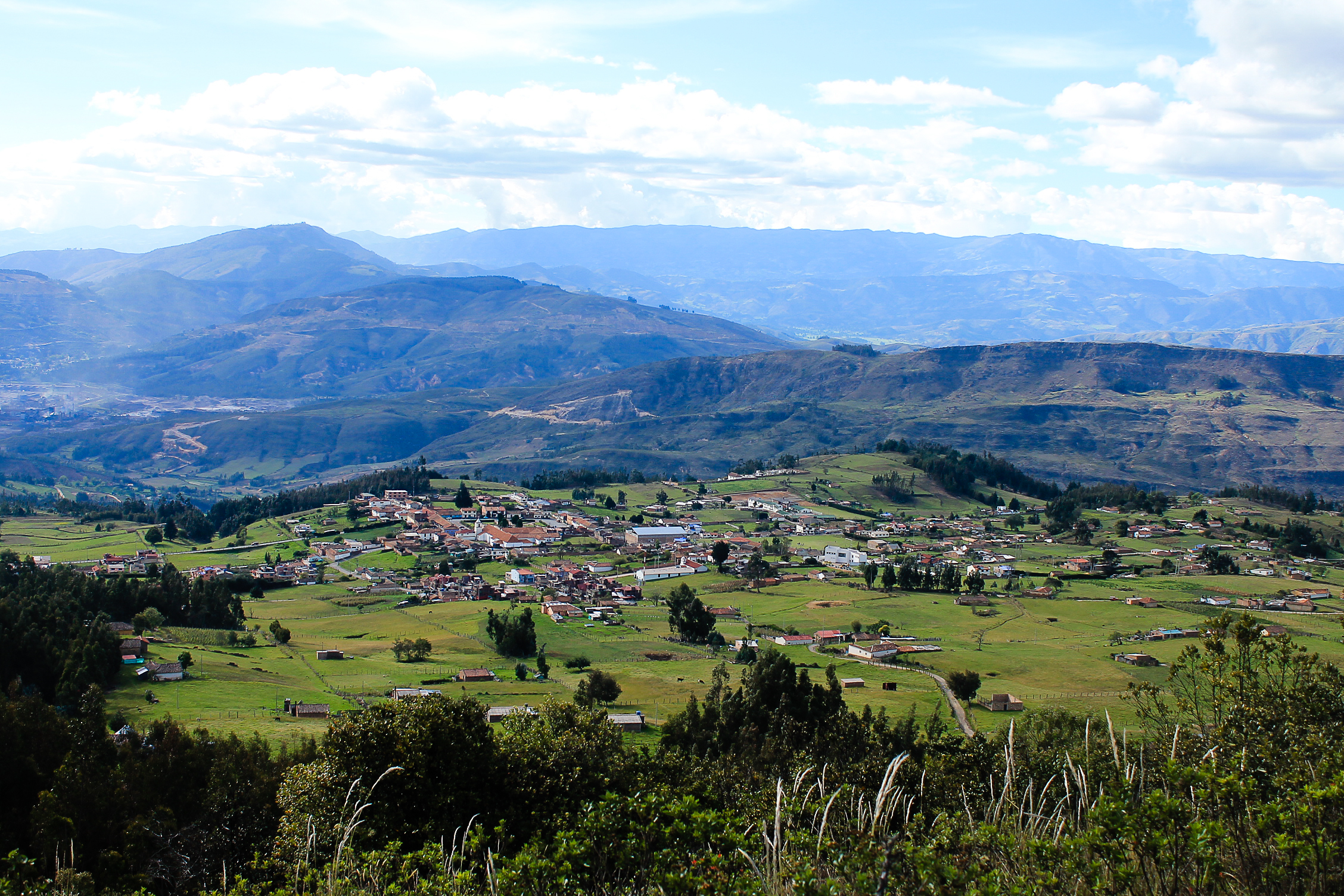
- View of Tópaga

- Flag

- Location of the municipality and town of Tópaga in the Boyacá Department of Colombia
- Country: Colombia
- Department: Boyacá Department
- Province: Sugamuxi Province
- Founded: 6 March 1593
- Founder: Álvaro Leiva

Government
  - Mayor: Álvaro Henry Barrera Díaz (2020-2023)

Area
  - Municipality and town: 37 km^{2} (14 sq mi)
  - Urban: 6.4 km^{2} (2.5 sq mi)
- Elevation: 2,900 m (9,500 ft)

Population (2015)
  - Municipality and town: 3,694
  - Density: 100/km^{2} (260/sq mi)
  - Urban: 1,406
- Time zone: UTC-5 (Colombia Standard Time)
- Website: Official website

Tópaga (Spanish pronunciation: [ˈtopaɣa]) is a town and municipality in the Sugamuxi Province, part of the Colombian department of Boyacá. Tópaga is situated on the Altiplano Cundiboyacense with the urban center at an altitude of 2,900 metres (9,500 ft) while the topography varies over the municipality from 2,400 metres (7,900 ft) to 3,200 metres (10,500 ft). It borders Nobsa and Corrales in the west, in the east Mongua and Gámeza, in the north Gámeza and in the south Monguí and Sogamoso. Department capital Tunja is 98 kilometres (61 mi) away. Chicamocha River flows through Tópaga.

== Etymology ==
The name Tópaga comes from Chibcha and means "Behind father river".

== History ==
Before the Spanish conquest, Tópaga was inhabited by the Muisca. The village was ruled by a cacique with the same name as the village, loyal to the iraca of Sugamuxi. The iraca was educated by messenger god Bochica according to the religion of the Muisca.

Modern Tópaga was founded in 1593 by Álvaro Leiva.

== Economy ==
Main economical activity of Tópaga is coal mining, used to produce electrical energy.

== Gallery ==
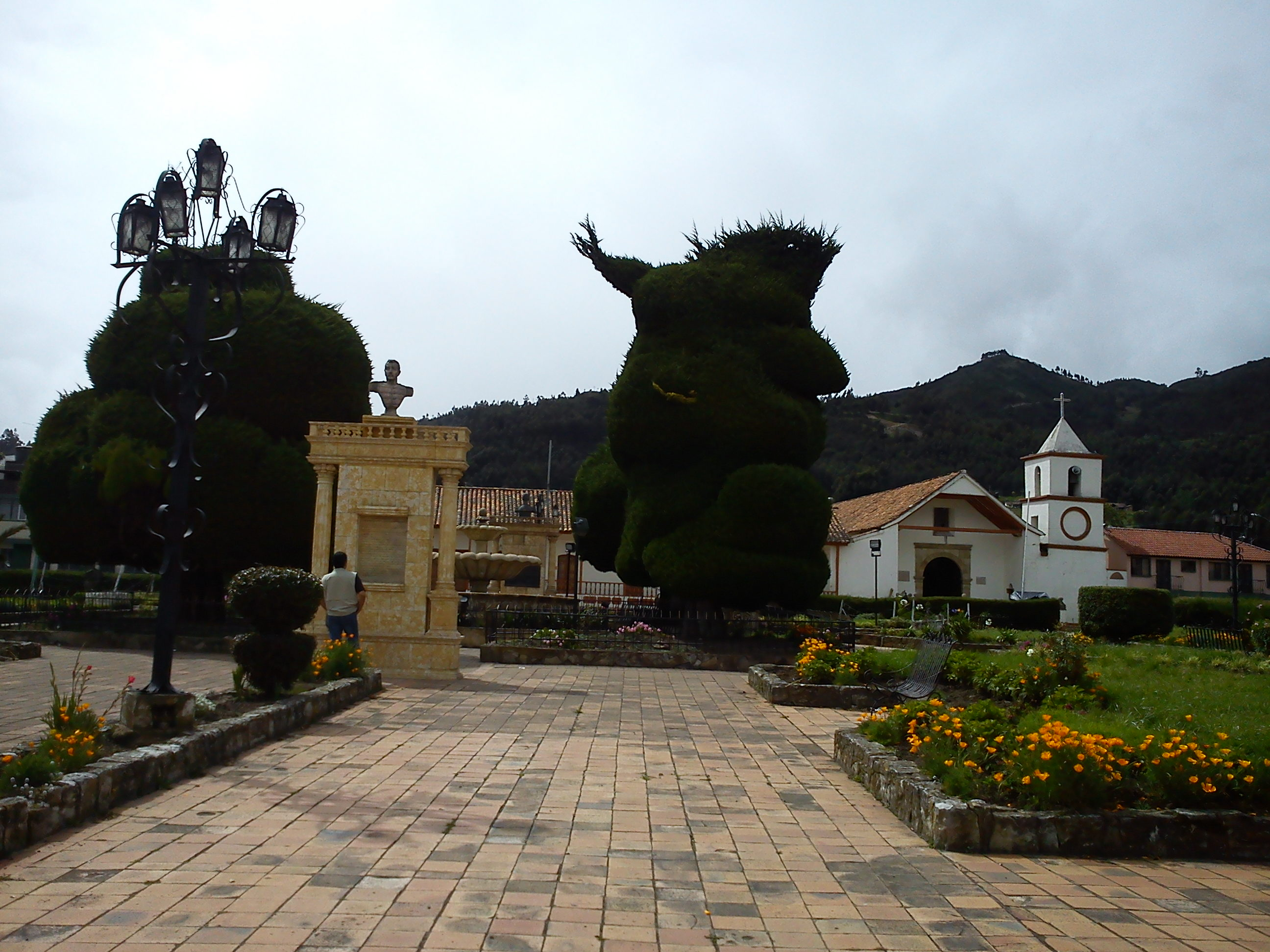
Central square

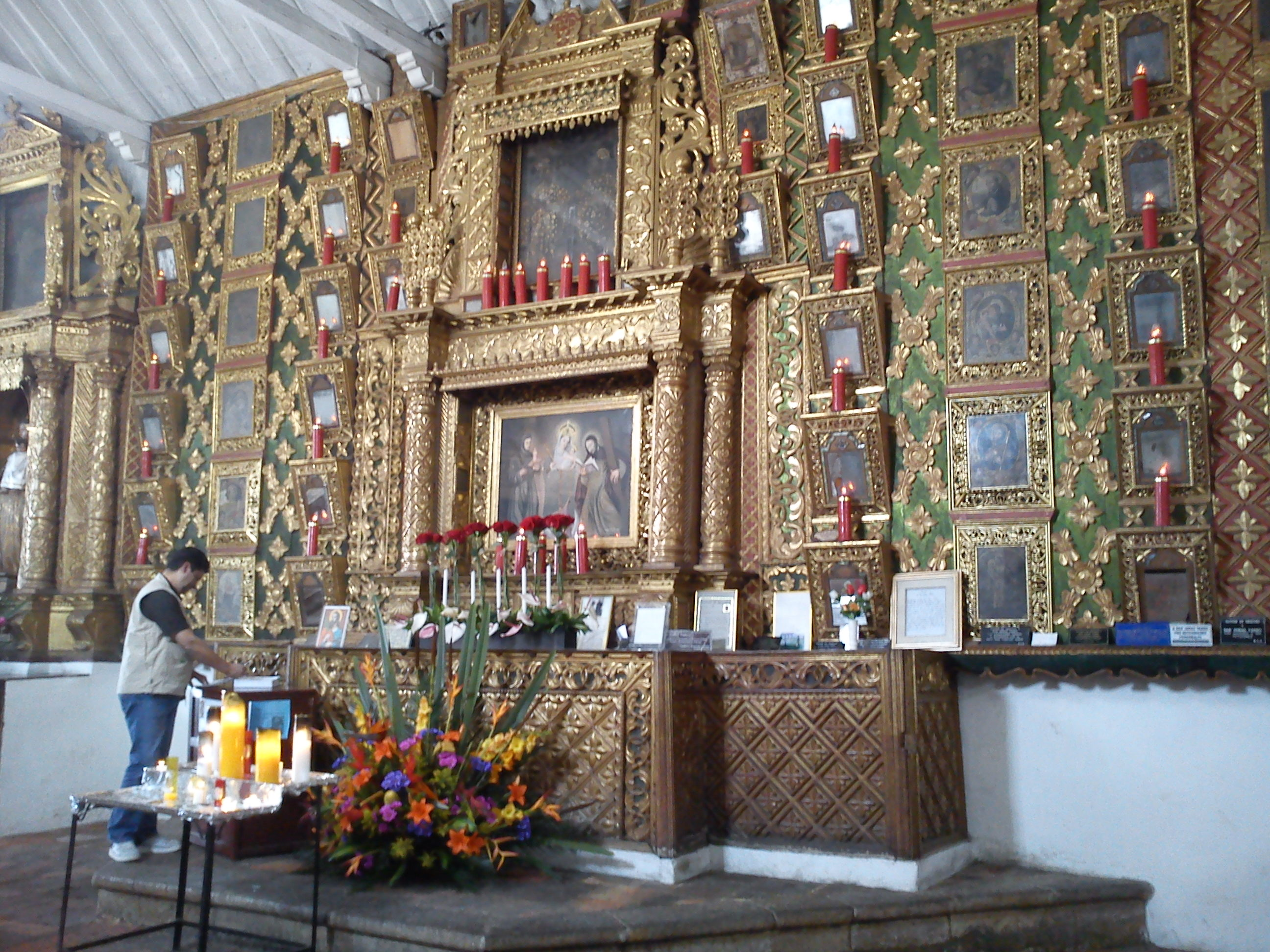
Chapel interior

=== Panorama ===
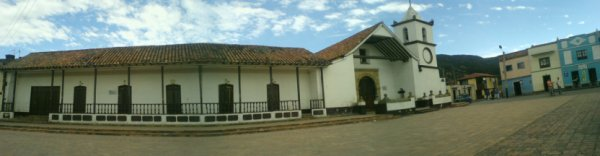
Central square of Tópaga
