= Mongua =

Coordinates: 5°45′N 72°48′W

- Municipality and town
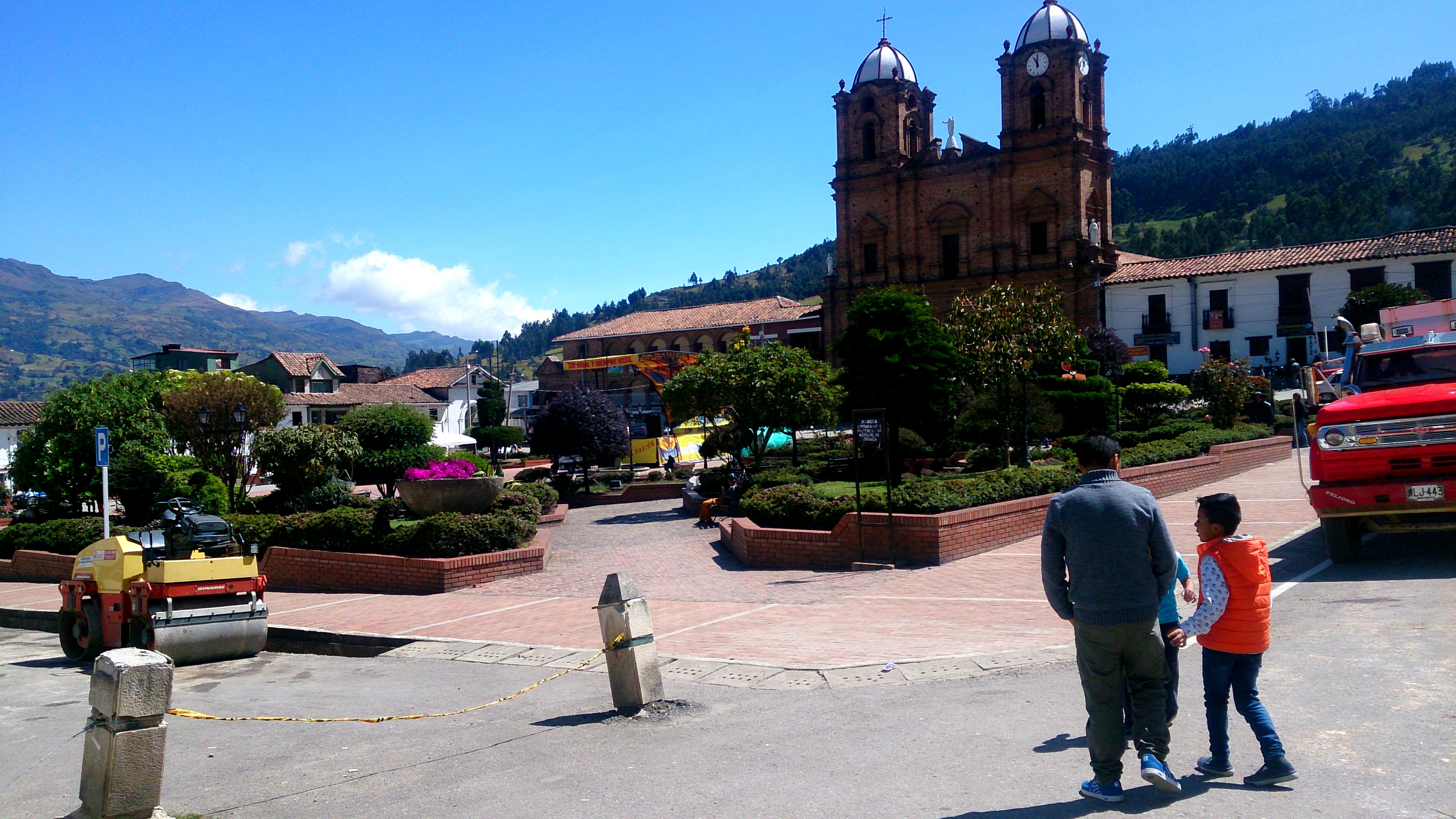
- Central square of Mongua

- Flag

- Location of the municipality and town of Mongua in the Boyacá Department of Colombia.
- Country: Colombia
- Department: Boyacá Department
- Province: Sugamuxi Province
- Founded: 4 November 1977

Government
  - Mayor: Marco Fidel Silva Rojas (2020-2023)

Area
  - Municipality and town: 365.5 km^{2} (141.1 sq mi)
  - Urban: 13.79 km^{2} (5.32 sq mi)
- Elevation: 2,975 m (9,760 ft)

Population (2005)
  - Municipality and town: 4,717
  - Urban: 1,628
- Time zone: UTC-5 (Colombia Standard Time)
- Website: Official website

Mongua is a town and municipality in Sugamuxi Province in the Colombian Department of Boyacá. Mongua is situated in the Eastern Ranges of the Colombian Andes at altitudes between 1,400 metres (4,600 ft) and 4,000 metres (13,000 ft). The municipality borders Gámeza, Socotá, Pisba, Labranzagrande, Aquitania, Sogamoso, Monguí and Tópaga.

== History ==
In the centuries before the arrival of the Spanish conquistadors, the central highlands of Colombia (Altiplano Cundiboyacense) were inhabited by the Muisca. Mongua was part of the rule of the iraca of Sugamuxi. According to the Muisca religion, the messenger god Bochica traveled to Gámeza and took shelter in a cave called Toy´ña. The cacique of Mongua brought him gifts in the cave.

Mongua in the Chibcha language of the Muisca means either "bath on the hill", or "land of the rising Sun".

== Climate ==
Mongua features a subtropical highland climate (Köppen Cfb), heavily influenced by its high altitude in the Eastern Ranges of the Colombian Andes. The weather is characterized by cool temperatures with minor variations throughout the year, featuring an average daily high of around 14 °C (57 °F) and lows around 5 °C (41 °F). Precipitation is distributed across two rainy seasons, peaking significantly between April–May and October–November.

Climate data for Mongua (1991–2020)
Month	Jan	Feb	Mar	Apr	May	Jun	Jul	Aug	Sep	Oct	Nov	Dec	Year
Mean daily maximum °C (°F)	15.0 (59.0)	15.0 (59.0)	15.0 (59.0)	14.0 (57.2)	13.0 (55.4)	13.0 (55.4)	13.0 (55.4)	13.0 (55.4)	13.0 (55.4)	13.0 (55.4)	13.0 (55.4)	14.0 (57.2)	13.6 (56.5)
Mean daily minimum °C (°F)	5.0 (41.0)	6.0 (42.8)	6.0 (42.8)	7.0 (44.6)	7.0 (44.6)	6.0 (42.8)	5.0 (41.0)	5.0 (41.0)	6.0 (42.8)	7.0 (44.6)	7.0 (44.6)	6.0 (42.8)	6.1 (43.0)
Average precipitation mm (inches)	27.2 (1.07)	24.3 (0.96)	69.6 (2.74)	93.4 (3.68)	89.8 (3.54)	94.5 (3.72)	102.4 (4.03)	89.7 (3.53)	62.1 (2.44)	88.0 (3.46)	85.5 (3.37)	25.8 (1.02)	852.3 (33.56)
Source 1: IDEAM (precipitation data)
Source 2: Weather Spark (temperatures)

== Economy ==
Main economical activities in Mongua are agriculture (predominantly potatoes) and coal mining.

== Gallery ==
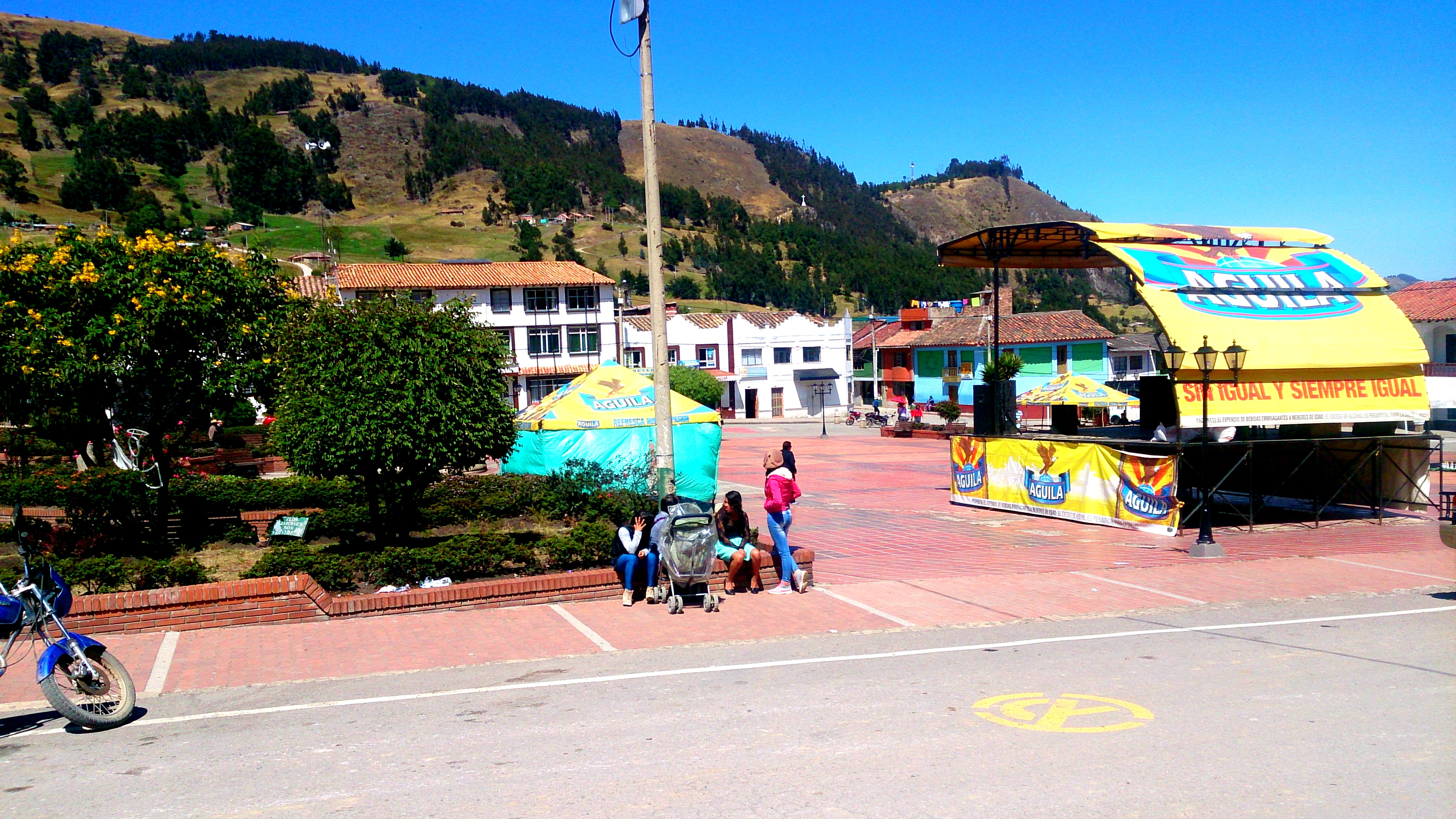
Central square

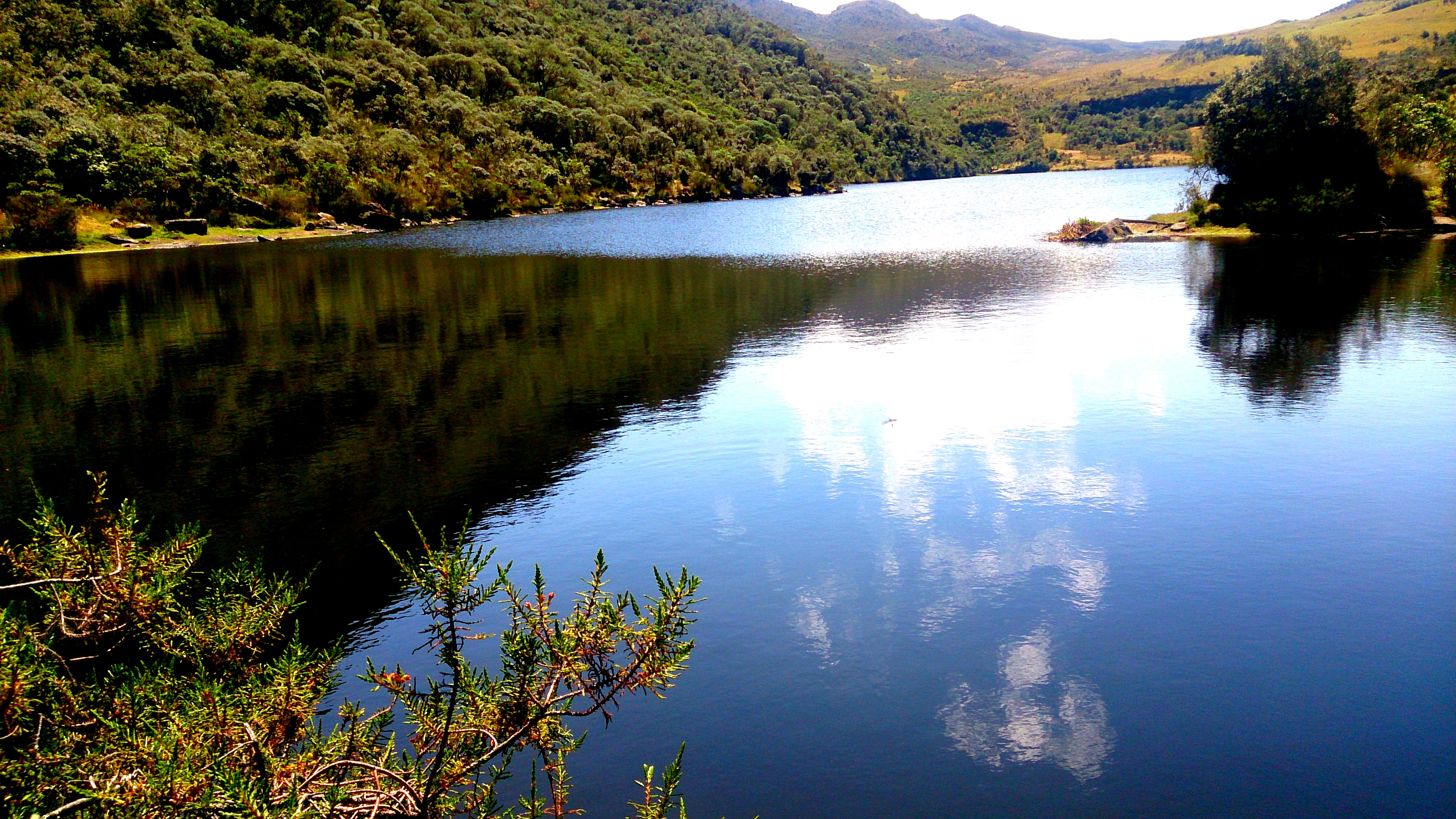
Laguna negra ("black lake")

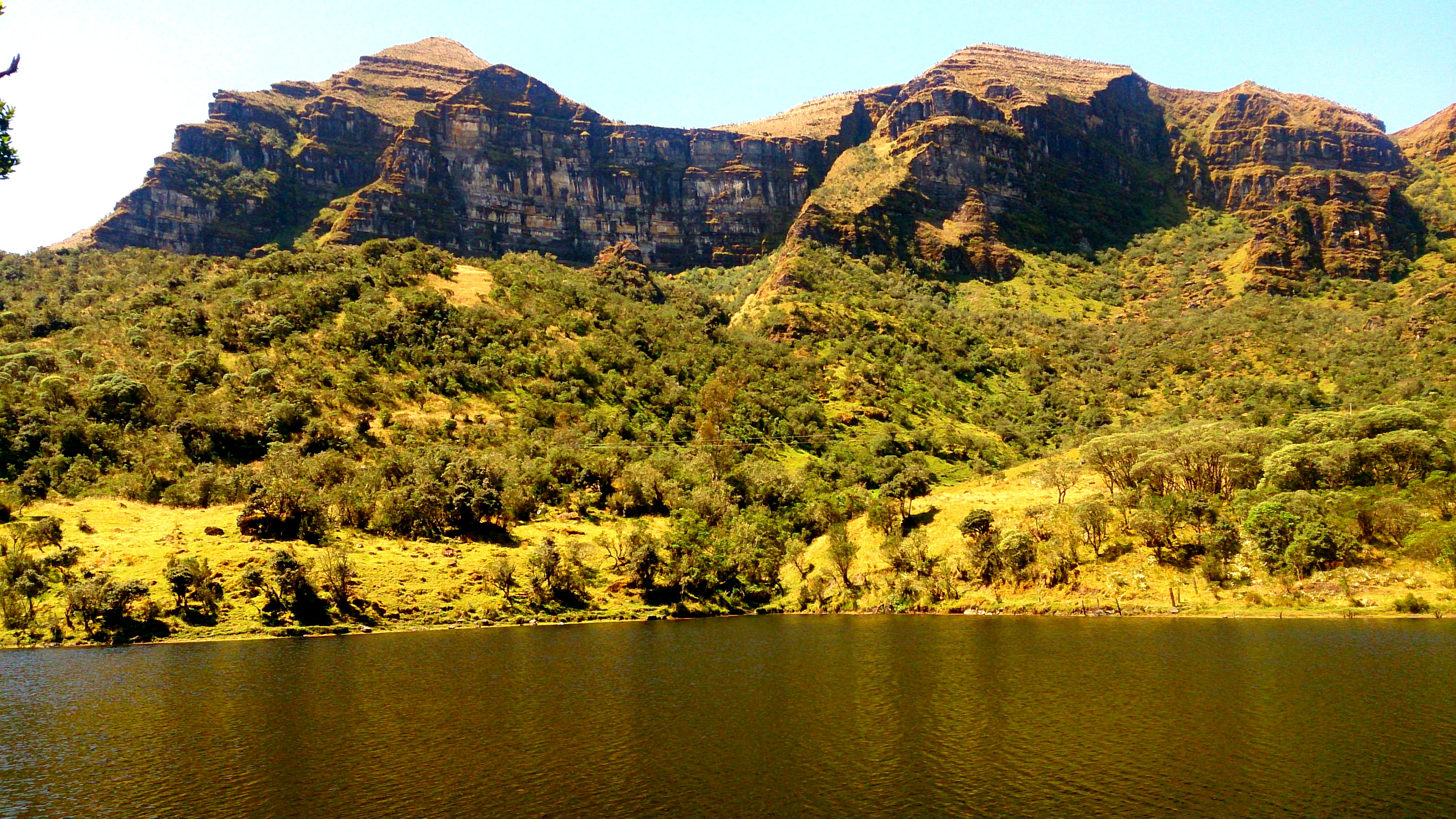
Laguna negra

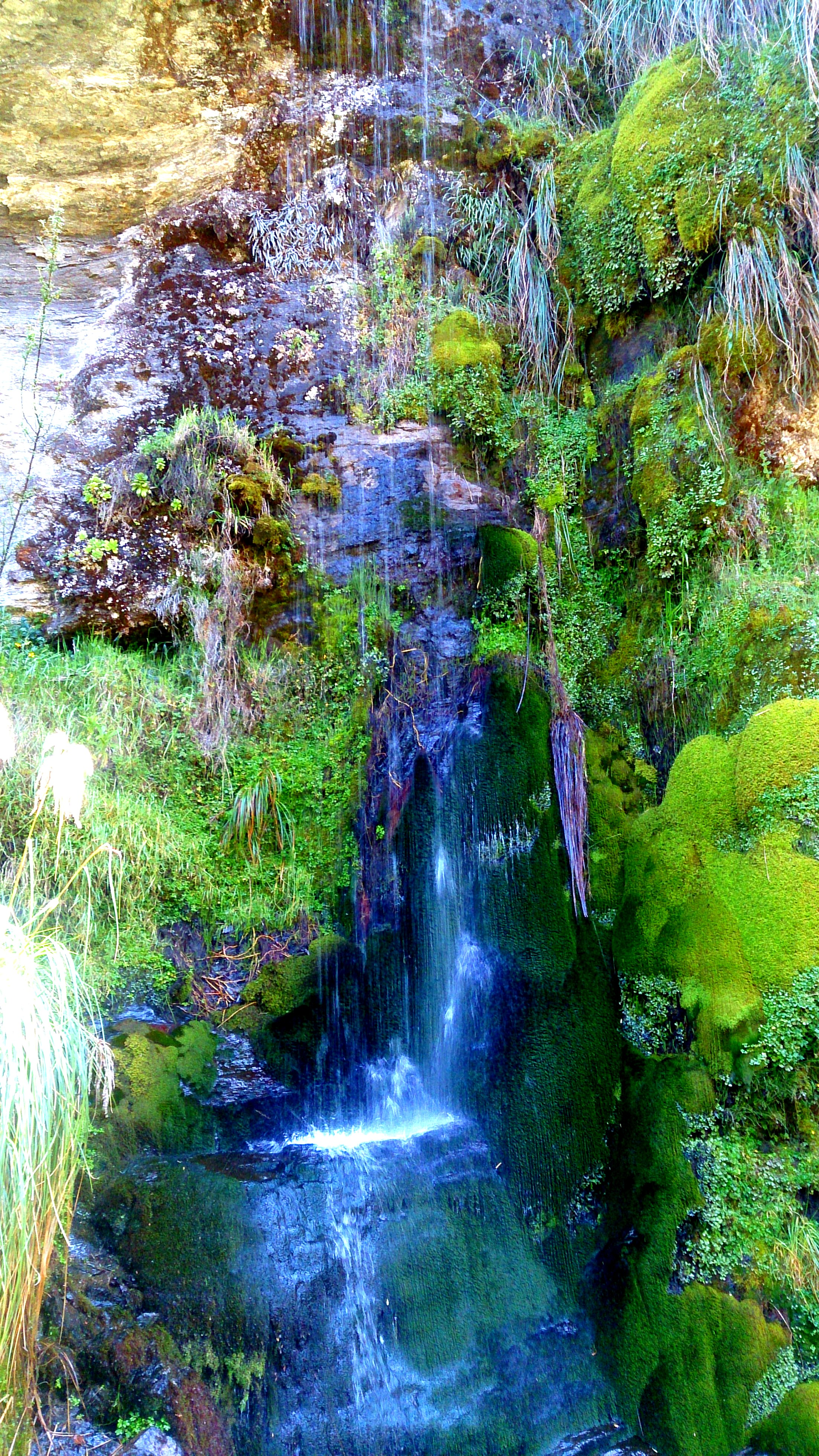
Laguna negra waterfall
