= Iza, Boyacá =

Coordinates: 5°36′N 72°59′W

Iza
- Municipality and town
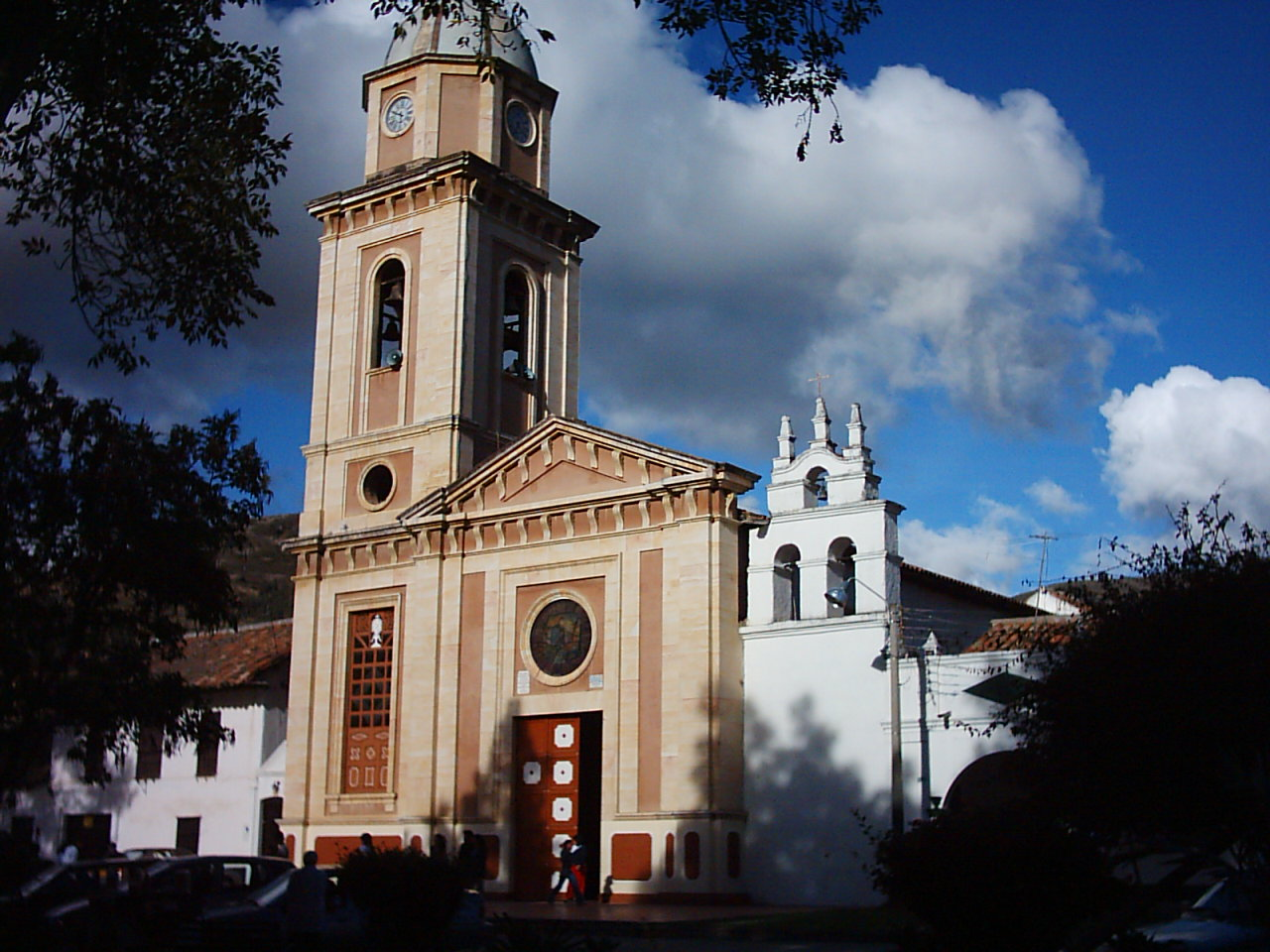
- Church of Iza

- Flag

- Location of the municipality and town of Iza in the Boyacá Department of Colombia
- Country: Colombia
- Department: Boyacá Department
- Province: Sugamuxi Province
- Founded: 2 January 1556

Government
  - Mayor: Robinson Leandro Salamanca Rincón (2020-2023)

Area
  - Municipality and town: 34 km^{2} (13 sq mi)
- Elevation: 2,560 m (8,400 ft)

Population
  - Municipality and town: 2,349
  - Density: 69/km^{2} (180/sq mi)
  - Urban: 1,026
- Time zone: UTC-5 (Colombia Standard Time)
- Website: Official website

Iza is a town and municipality in Boyacá Department, Colombia. Iza is located near the Tota Lake and part of the Sugamuxi Province, a subregion of Boyacá. Iza is located in the Eastern Ranges of the Colombian Andes on the Altiplano Cundiboyacense at a distance of 13 kilometres (8.1 mi) from Sogamoso and 90 kilometres (56 mi) from the department capital Tunja. The municipality borders Firavitoba and Sogamoso in the north, Sogamoso and Cuítiva in the east, in the west Pesca and Firavitoba, and in the south Cuítiva.

== History ==
Before the Spanish conquest, the area of Iza was inhabited first by indigenous groups during the Herrera Period and later by the Muisca, organized in the Muisca Confederation. Iza was ruled by the iraca of Sugamuxi, modern neighbouring Sogamoso. According to Muisca mythology, the messenger god Bochica is said to have lived outside Iza in a cave.

In the Chibcha language of the Muisca za means "night", and Iza means "place of healing".

Modern Iza was founded on January 2, 1554. The town is nicknamed Nido Verde de Boyacá; "Green Nest of Boyacá".

== Economy ==
Main economical activities of Iza are mining (coal and pozzolan) and agriculture.

== Born in Iza ==
- Jairo Pérez, former professional cyclist

== Gallery ==
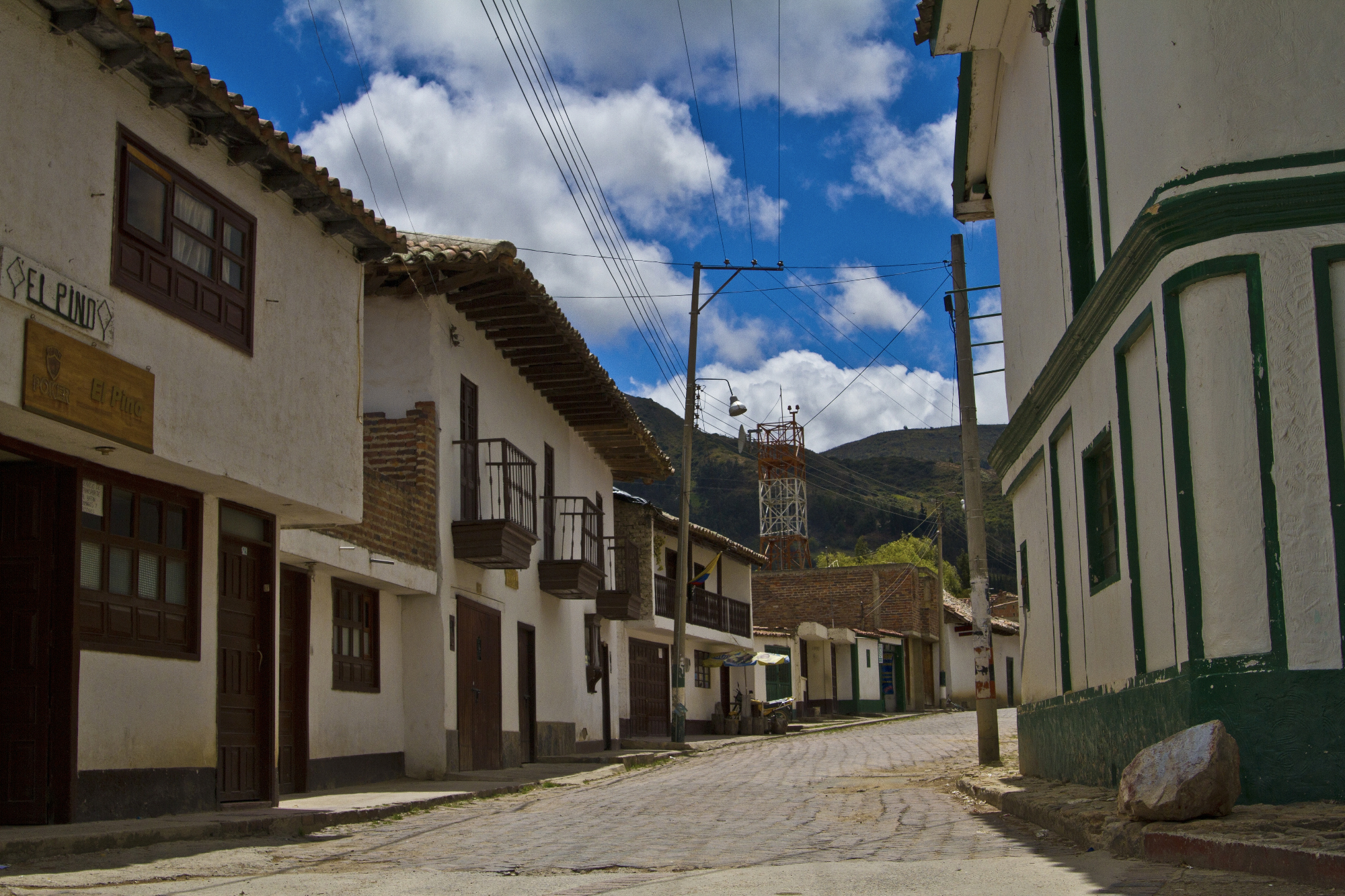
Street view

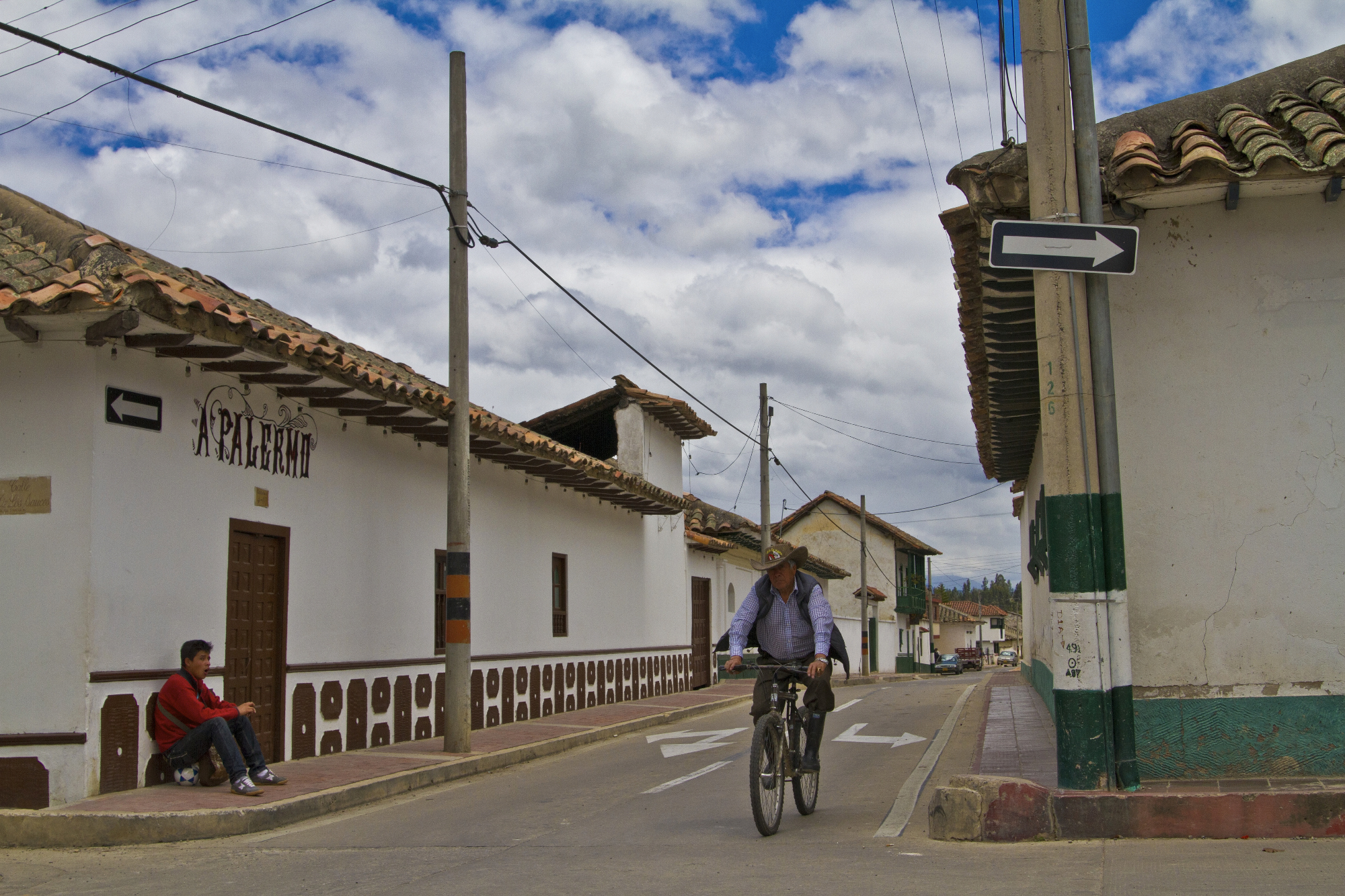
Street view

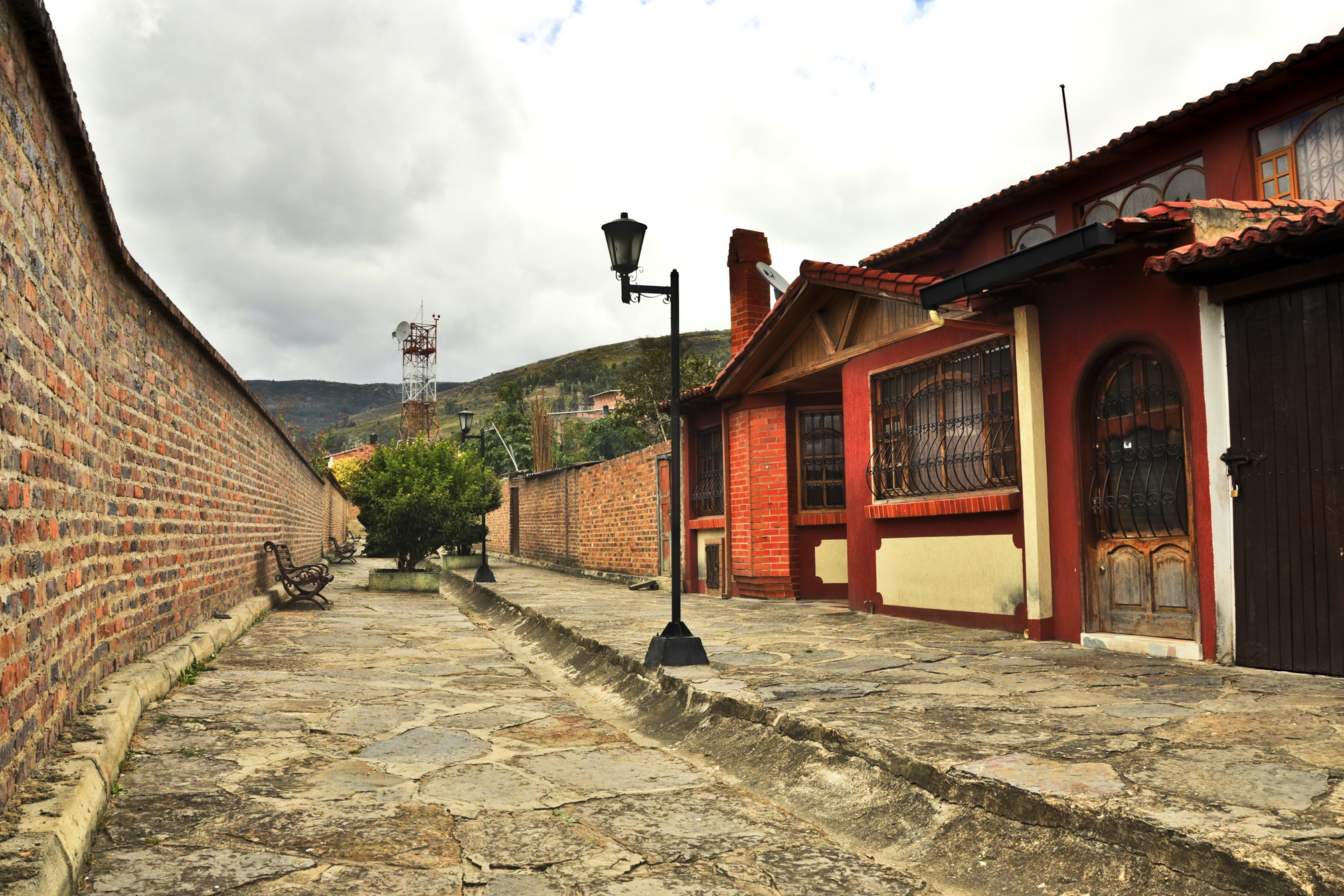
Street view

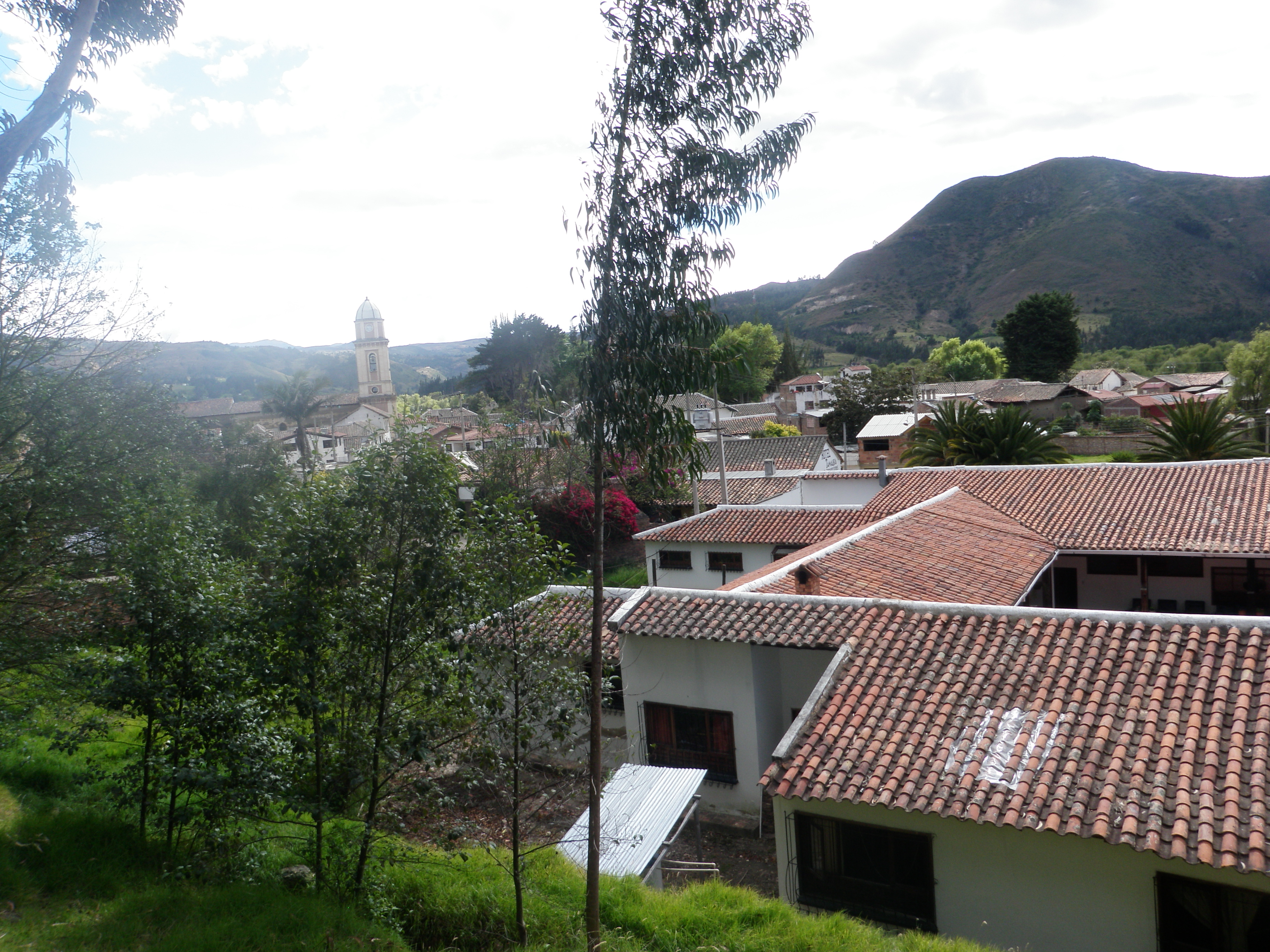
Mountain view
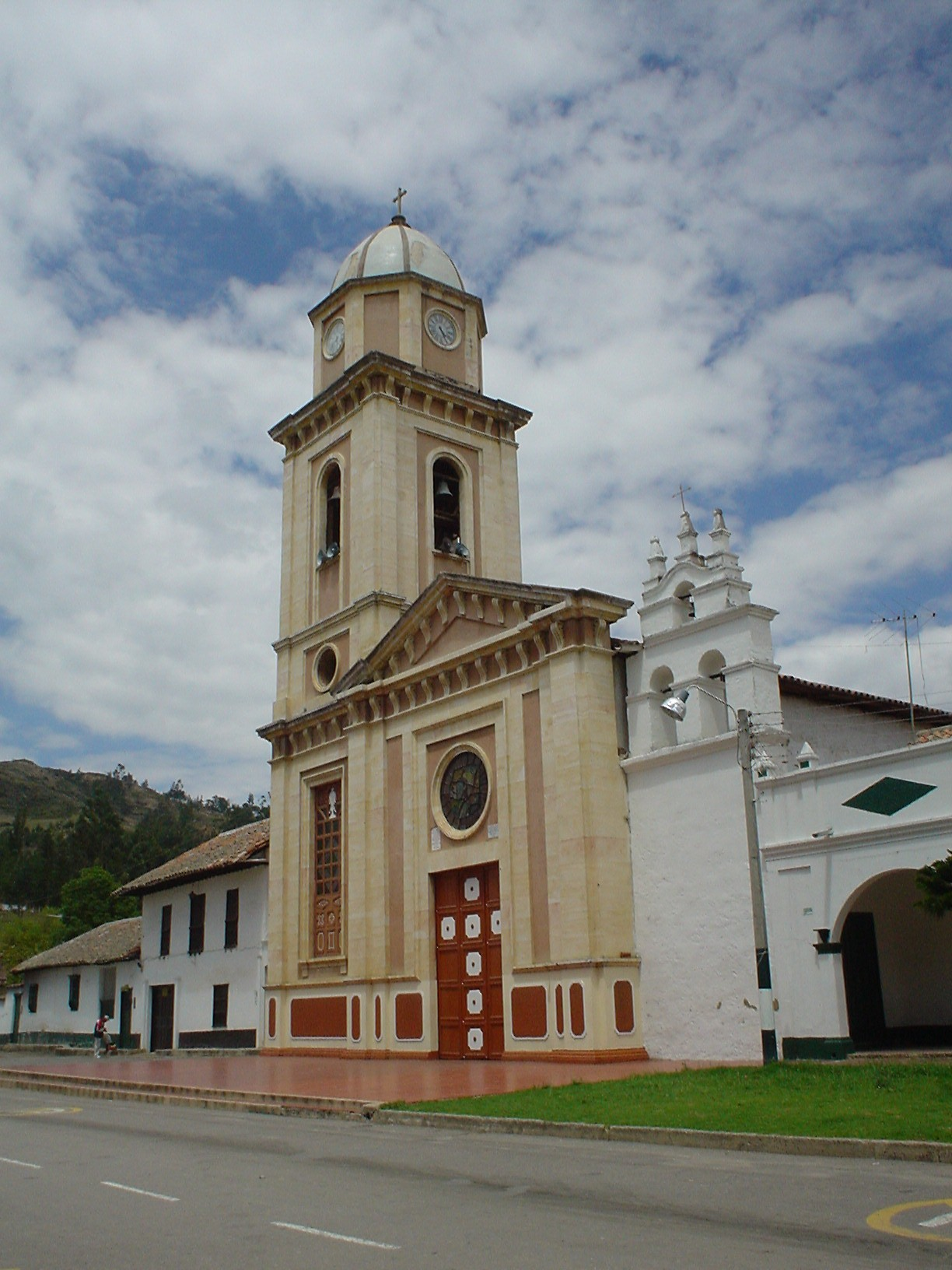
Church of Iza

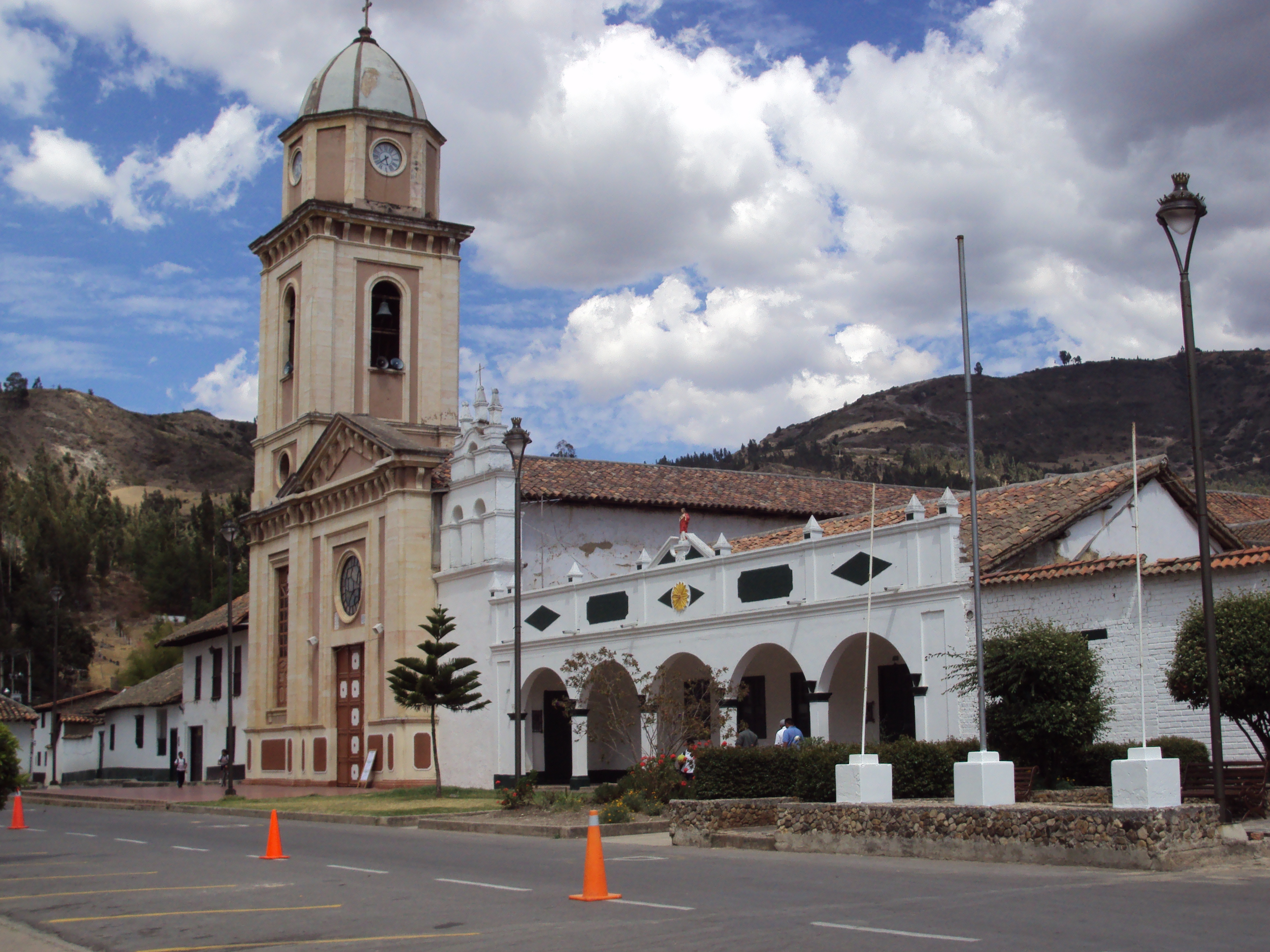
Church

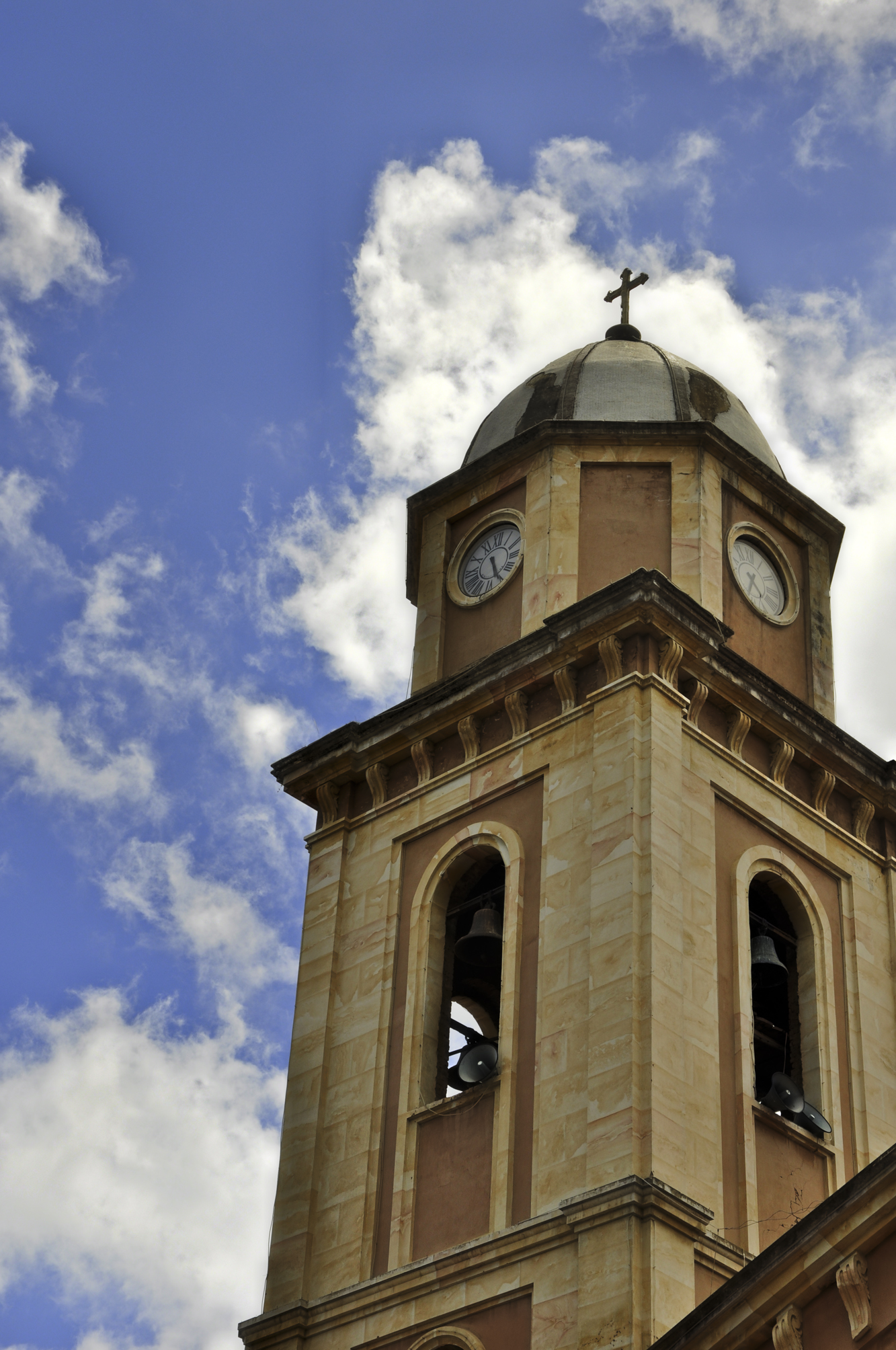
Church tower

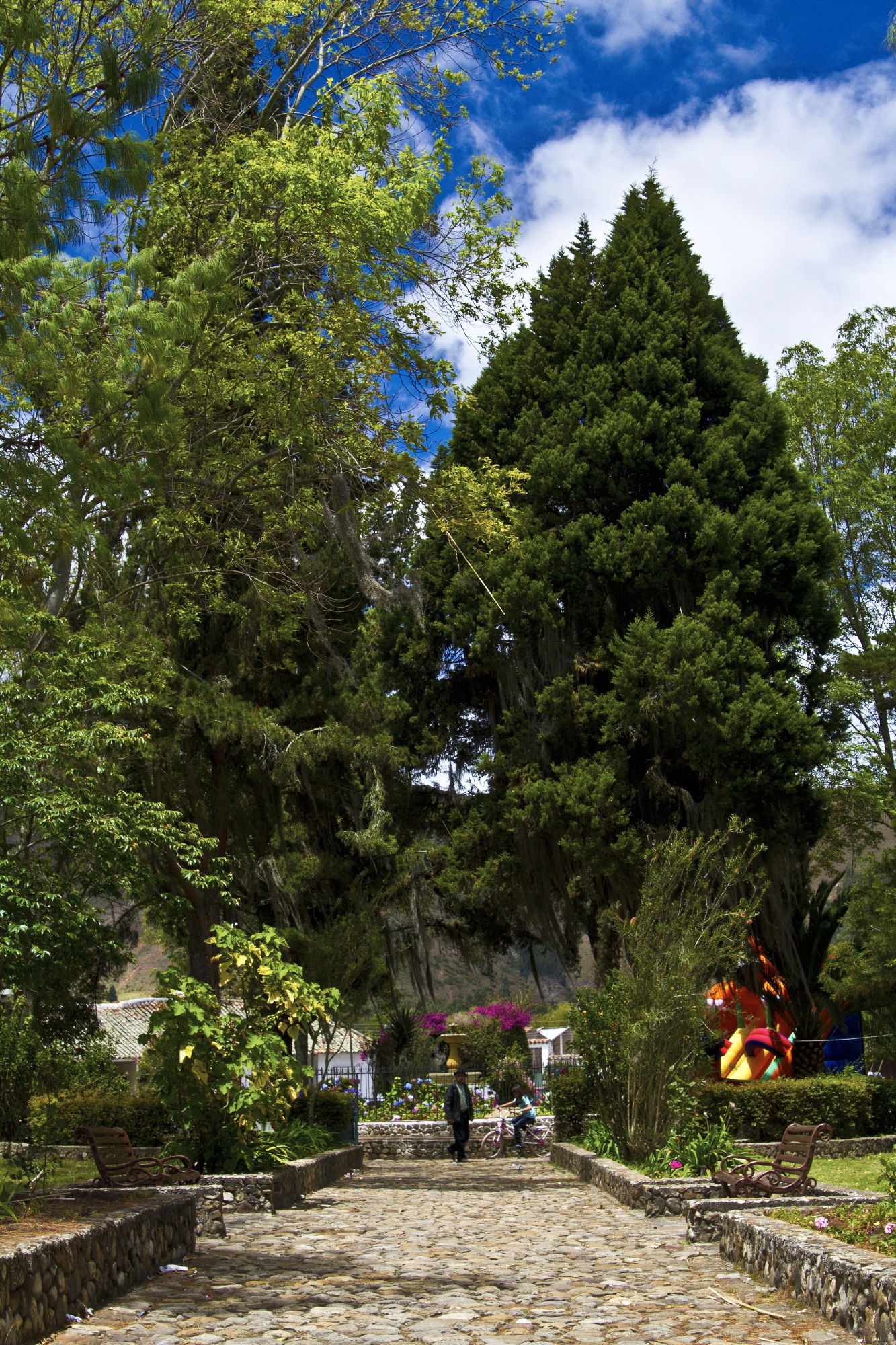
Central park
