= Pesca =

Coordinates: 5°35′N 73°03′W

- Municipality and town
- Flag Coat of arms
- Etymology: Muysccubun: "Strong enclosure"
- Location of the municipality and town of Pesca in the Boyacá Department of Colombia
- Country: Colombia
- Department: Boyacá Department
- Province: Sugamuxi Province
- Founded: 20 December 1548
- Founder: Juan de Sanct Martín

Government
  - Mayor: Manuel Alejandro Tambo Rodríguez (2020-2023)

Area
  - Municipality and town: 282 km^{2} (109 sq mi)
- Elevation: 2,858 m (9,377 ft)

Population (2015)
  - Municipality and town: 8,032
  - Density: 28.5/km^{2} (73.8/sq mi)
  - Urban: 2,004
- Time zone: UTC-5
- Website: Official website

Pesca is a town and municipality in the Colombian Department of Boyacá, part of the Sugamuxi Province, a subregion of Boyacá. The town is located in the Eastern Ranges of the Colombian Andes at altitudes between 2,540 metres (8,330 ft) and 4,000 metres (13,000 ft). Pesca is 108 kilometres (67 mi) west from the department capital Tunja and borders Firavitoba in the north, Iza in the northeast, Tuta in the northwest, in the east Tota, Zetaquirá in the south, Rondón and Siachoque in the southwest and Toca in the west.

== Notes ==
Pesca is 108 kilometres (67 mi) east from the department capital Tunja

== Etymology ==
In the Chibcha language of the Muisca, Pesca means "strong enclosure".

== History ==
Before the arrival of the Spanish in the 1530s, Pesca was part of the Muisca Confederation, a confederation of different rulers; zaques based in Hunza, zipas ruling from Muyquytá and caciques in other territories. Pesca was reigned by the iraca of sacred City of the Sun Sugamuxi, now called Sogamoso.

Modern Pesca was founded by Juan de Sanct Martín on December 20, 1548.

== Economy ==
Main economical activities in Pesca are agriculture (potatoes, maize, wheat, peas, beans and ibias) and livestock farming.

== Born in Pesca ==
- Víctor Herrera, former professional cyclist
- Miguel Ángel López, professional cyclist
