= Sugamuxi Province =

Sugamuxi Province Provincia de Sugamuxi
- Province
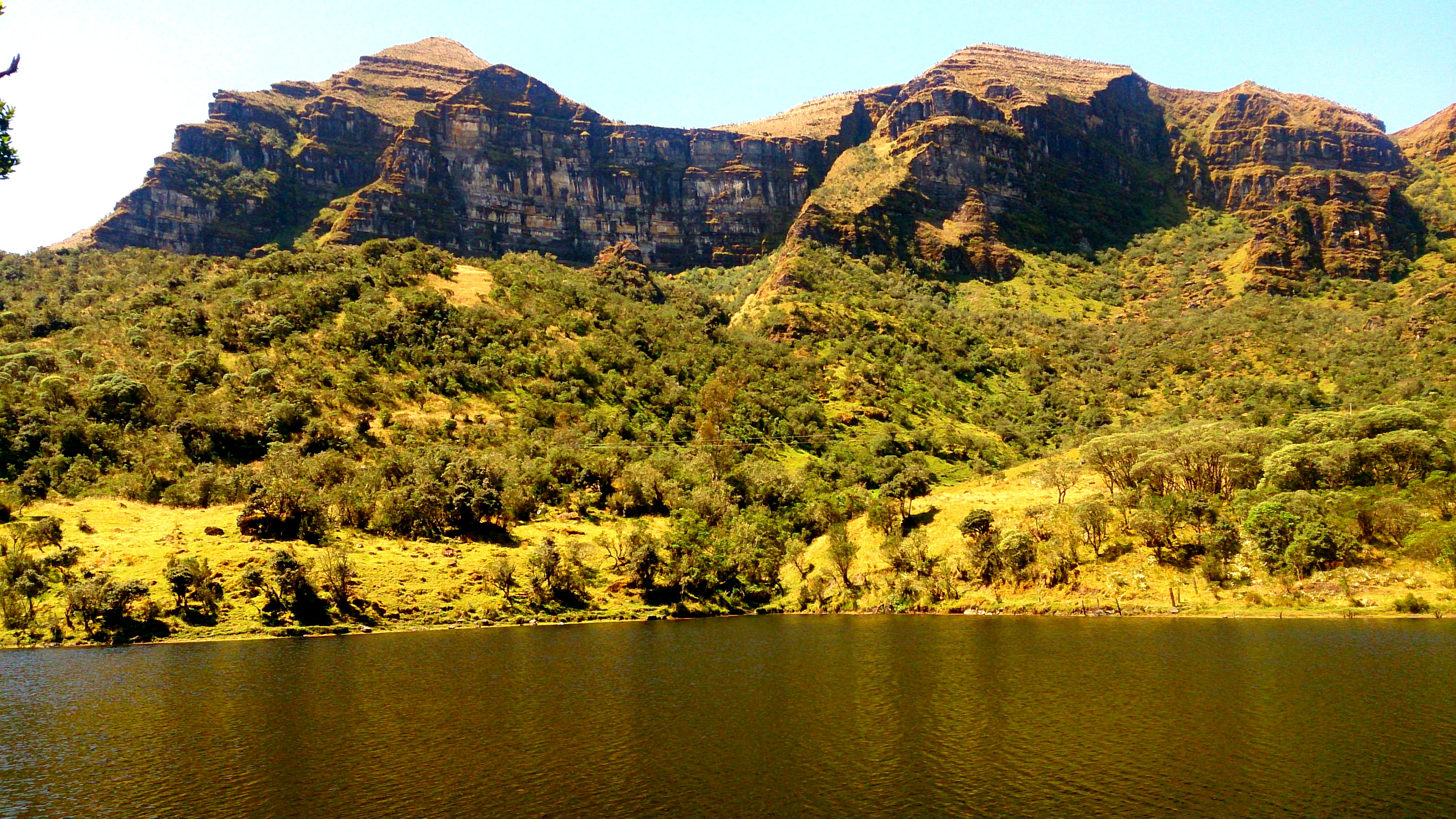
- Laguna Negra, Ocetá Páramo
- Etymology: Sugamuxi
- Location of Sugamuxi Province in Colombia
- Coordinates: 5°43′00″N 72°55′15″W
- Country: Colombia
- Department: Boyacá
- Capital: Sogamoso
- Municipalities: 13

Area
  - Total: 2,655.63 km^{2} (1,025.34 sq mi)

Population (2015)
  - Total: 200,021
  - Density: 75.3196/km^{2} (195.077/sq mi)
- Time zone: UTC−5 (COT)
- Indigenous groups: Muisca

The Sugamuxi Province (Spanish pronunciation: [suɣaˈmuksi]) is a subregion of the Colombian Department of Boyacá. The subregion is formed by 13 municipalities.

== Etymology ==
The name of the province comes from Sugamuxi, the last iraca of the Muisca and means in Chibcha: "Dwelling of the Sun".

== Subdivision ==
Sugamuxi Province comprises 13 municipalities:

Municipality bold is capital	Area km^{2}	Elevation (m) urban centre	Population 2015	Founded	Map
Aquitania	943	3030	15,241	1777	
Cuítiva	43	2750	1906	1550	
Firavitoba	109.9	2500	5730	1655	
Gámeza	88	2750	4856	1585	
Iza	34	2560	2349	1556	
Mongua	365.5	2975	4717	1977	
Monguí	81	2900	4986	1601	
Nobsa	55.39	2510	16,271	1593	
Pesca	282	2858	8032	1548	
Sogamoso	208.54	2569	112,790	1810	
Tibasosa	94.3	2538	14,063	1778	
Tópaga	37	2900	3694	1593	
Tota	314	2870	5386	15XX	
Total	2655.63		200,021		
