= Nobsa =

- Municipality and town
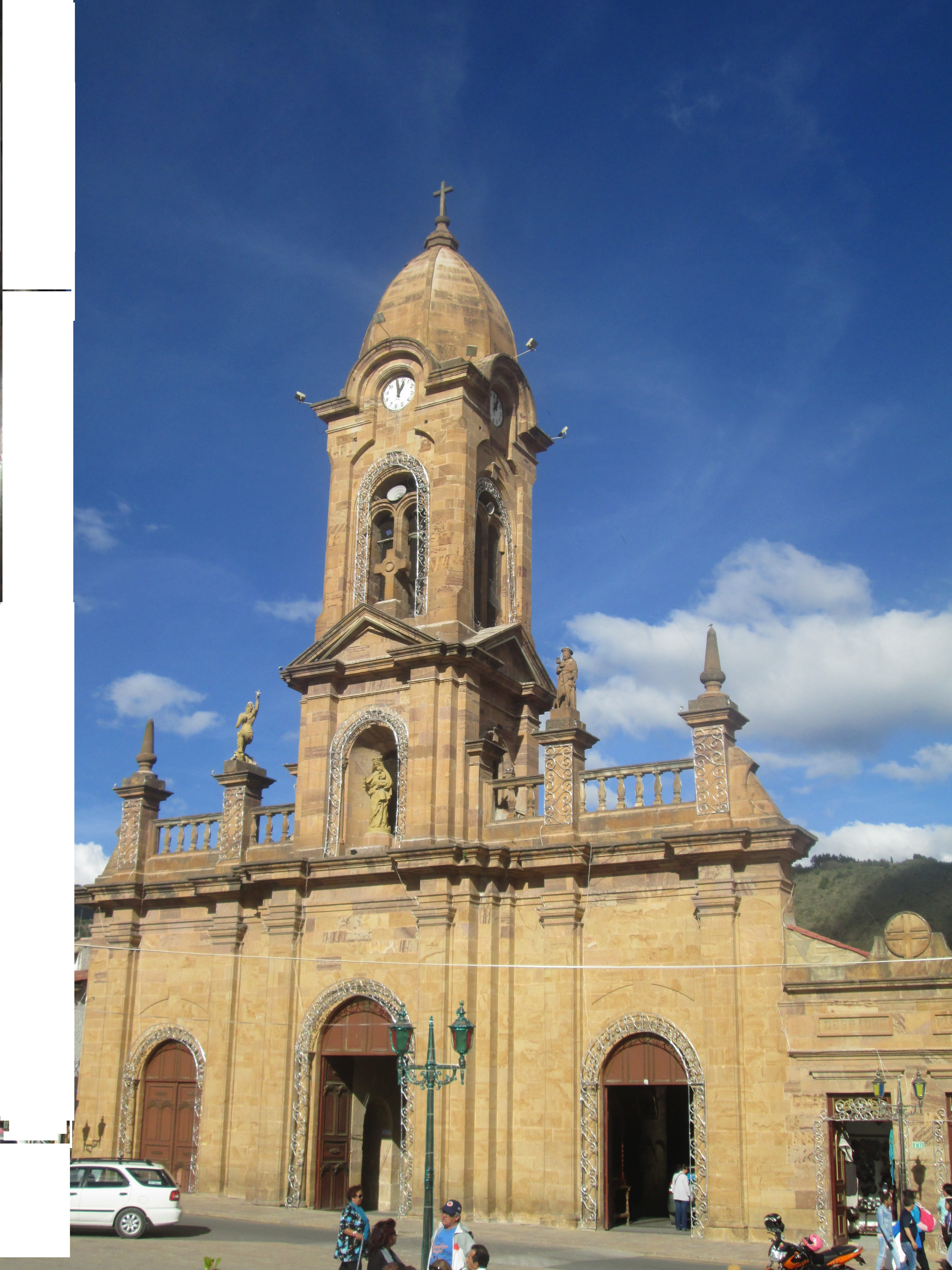
- Church of Nobsa

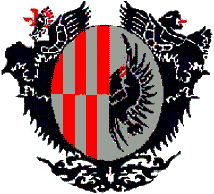
- Flag Coat of arms

- Location of the municipality and town of Nobsa in the Boyacá Department of Colombia
- Coordinates: 5°46′N 72°57′W
- Country: Colombia
- Department: Boyacá Department
- Province: Sugamuxi Province
- Founded: 9 January 1593
- Founder: Jerónimo Holguín & Misael Millán

Government
  - Mayor: Alfredo Hernando Niño Sierra (2020-2023)

Area
  - Municipality and town: 55.39 km^{2} (21.39 sq mi)
  - Urban: 13.9 km^{2} (5.4 sq mi)
- Elevation: 2,510 m (8,230 ft)

Population (2015)
  - Municipality and town: 16,271
  - Density: 293.8/km^{2} (760.8/sq mi)
  - Urban: 6,389
- Time zone: UTC-5 (Colombia Standard Time)
- Website: Official website

Nobsa is a town and municipality in Sugamuxi Province, part of Boyacá department. The urban centre is situated on the Altiplano Cundiboyacense at 125 kilometres (78 mi) from the national capital Bogotá at an elevation of 2,510 metres (8,230 ft). Other parts of the municipality range in elevation between 2,500 metres (8,200 ft) and 3,300 metres (10,800 ft). The Chicamocha River flows through Nobsa. The municipality borders Santa Rosa de Viterbo and Floresta in the north, Corrales and Tópaga in the east, Tibasosa and Santa Rosa de Viterbo in the west and Tibasosa and Santa Rosa de Viterbo in the south.

== Etymology ==
Nobsa is derived from Chibcha and means "Decent bath of today".

== History ==
In the times before the Spanish conquest, the area of Nobsa was part of the Muisca Confederation, a loose confederation of the Muisca. Nobsa was ruled by the Tundama of Tundama.

Modern Nobsa was founded on January 9, 1593 by Jerónimo Holguín and Misael Millán.

== Economy ==
Main economical activities of Nobsa are agriculture, livestock farming, mining (predominantly limestone) and the production of wooden furniture.

== Climate ==
Climate data for Nobsa (Belencito), elevation 2,530 m (8,300 ft), (1981–2010)
Month	Jan	Feb	Mar	Apr	May	Jun	Jul	Aug	Sep	Oct	Nov	Dec	Year
Mean daily maximum °C (°F)	23.7 (74.7)	23.8 (74.8)	23.6 (74.5)	22.2 (72.0)	21.8 (71.2)	21.1 (70.0)	20.7 (69.3)	21.0 (69.8)	21.4 (70.5)	22.0 (71.6)	22.3 (72.1)	22.5 (72.5)	22.1 (71.8)
Daily mean °C (°F)	15.8 (60.4)	16.1 (61.0)	16.2 (61.2)	16.0 (60.8)	15.7 (60.3)	15.3 (59.5)	14.9 (58.8)	15.0 (59.0)	15.1 (59.2)	15.4 (59.7)	15.8 (60.4)	15.6 (60.1)	15.6 (60.1)
Mean daily minimum °C (°F)	7.6 (45.7)	8.0 (46.4)	9.1 (48.4)	10.0 (50.0)	10.0 (50.0)	9.3 (48.7)	8.8 (47.8)	8.7 (47.7)	8.5 (47.3)	9.2 (48.6)	9.3 (48.7)	8.3 (46.9)	8.9 (48.0)
Average precipitation mm (inches)	33.0 (1.30)	37.0 (1.46)	77.1 (3.04)	115.3 (4.54)	108.3 (4.26)	53.9 (2.12)	50.9 (2.00)	44.4 (1.75)	64.1 (2.52)	102.7 (4.04)	88.0 (3.46)	44.7 (1.76)	819.3 (32.26)
Average precipitation days (≥ 1.0 mm)	6	8	13	17	17	14	14	14	14	17	14	10	152
Average relative humidity (%)	71	70	73	76	77	76	76	75	75	77	78	75	75
Mean monthly sunshine hours	207.7	163.7	148.8	111.0	120.9	129.0	145.7	136.4	120.0	117.8	138.0	182.9	1,721.9
Mean daily sunshine hours	6.7	5.8	4.8	3.7	3.9	4.3	4.7	4.4	4.0	3.8	4.6	5.9	4.7
Source: Instituto de Hidrologia Meteorologia y Estudios Ambientales

== Gallery ==
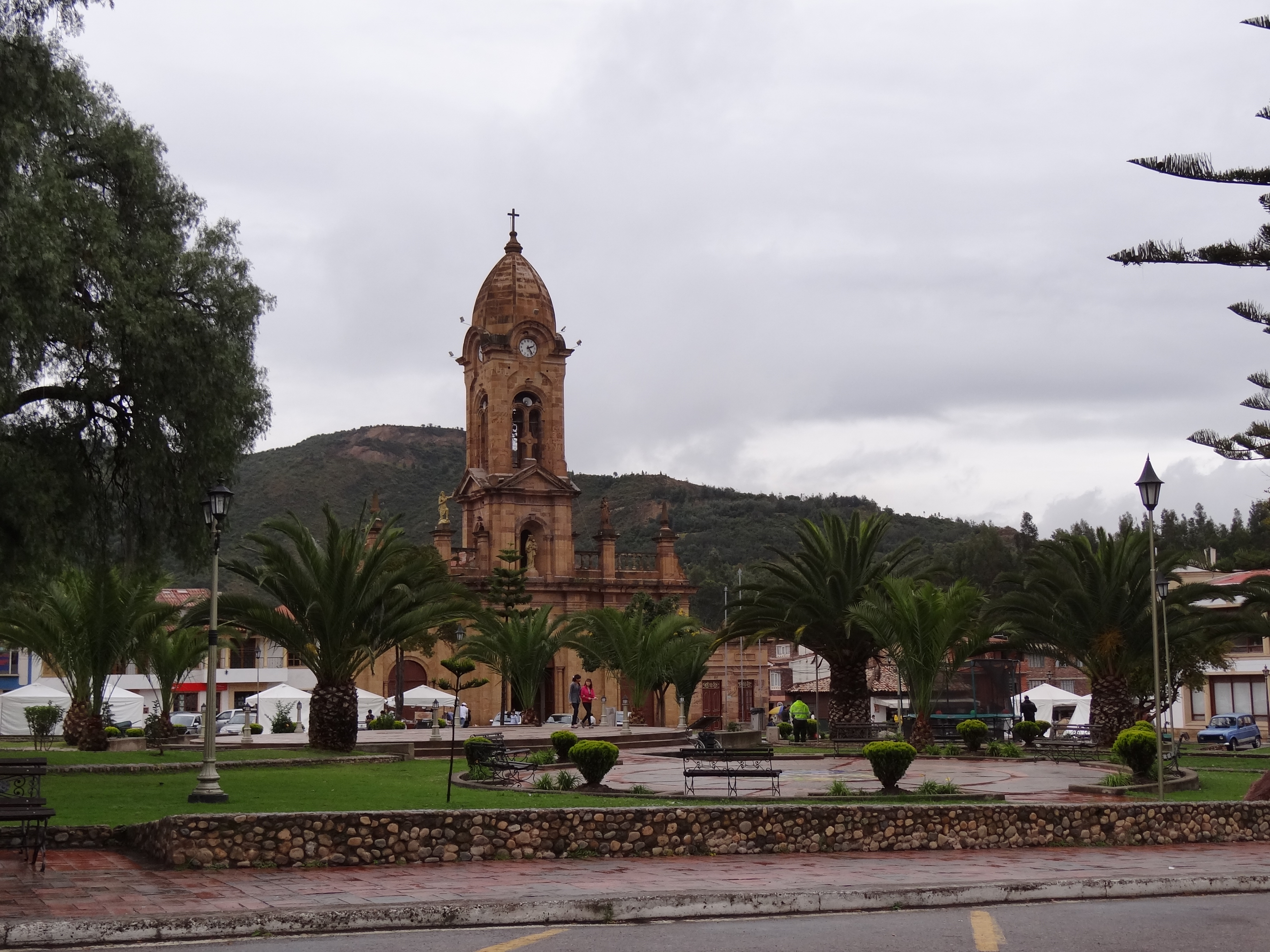
Central square

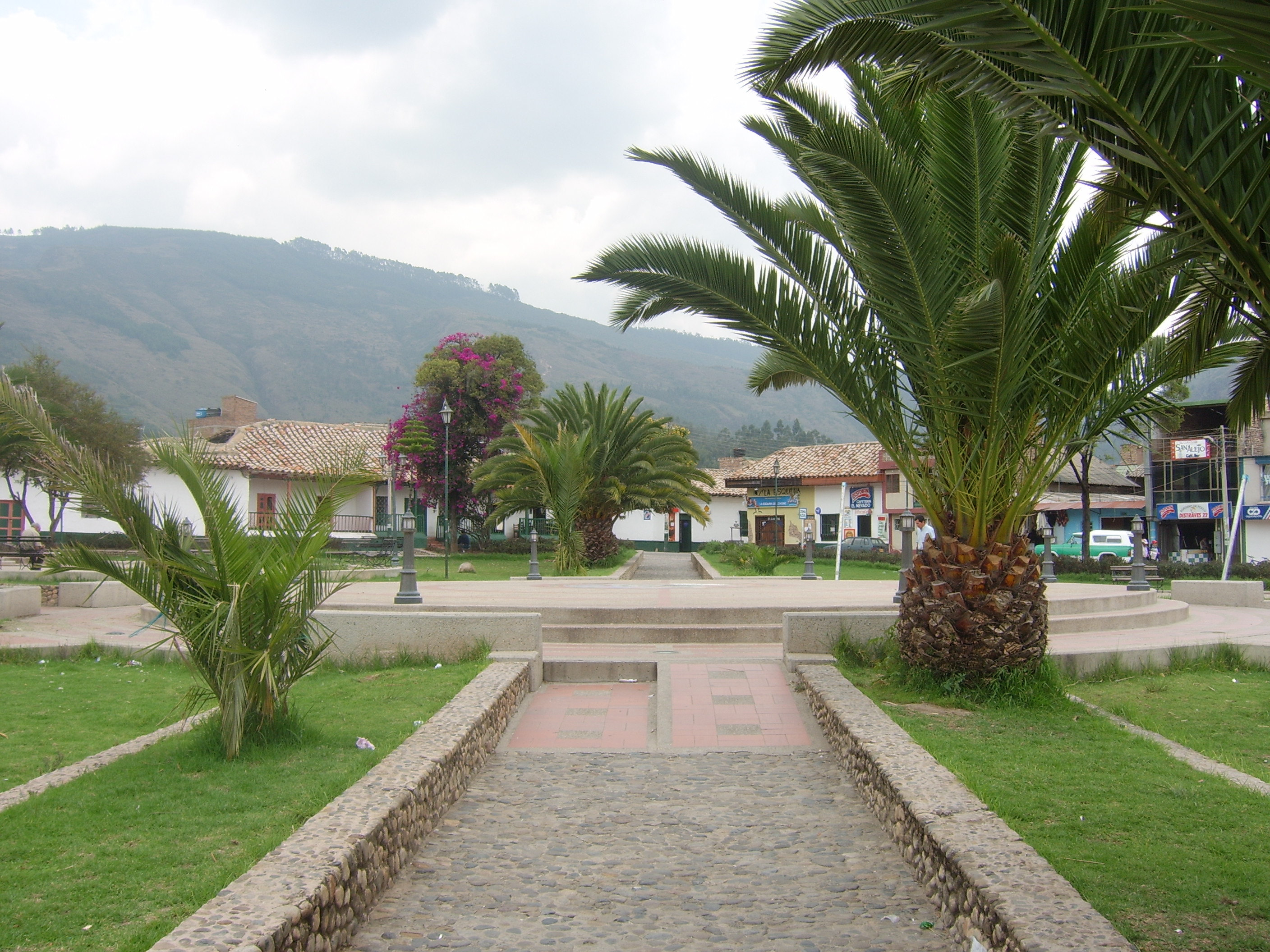
Central square

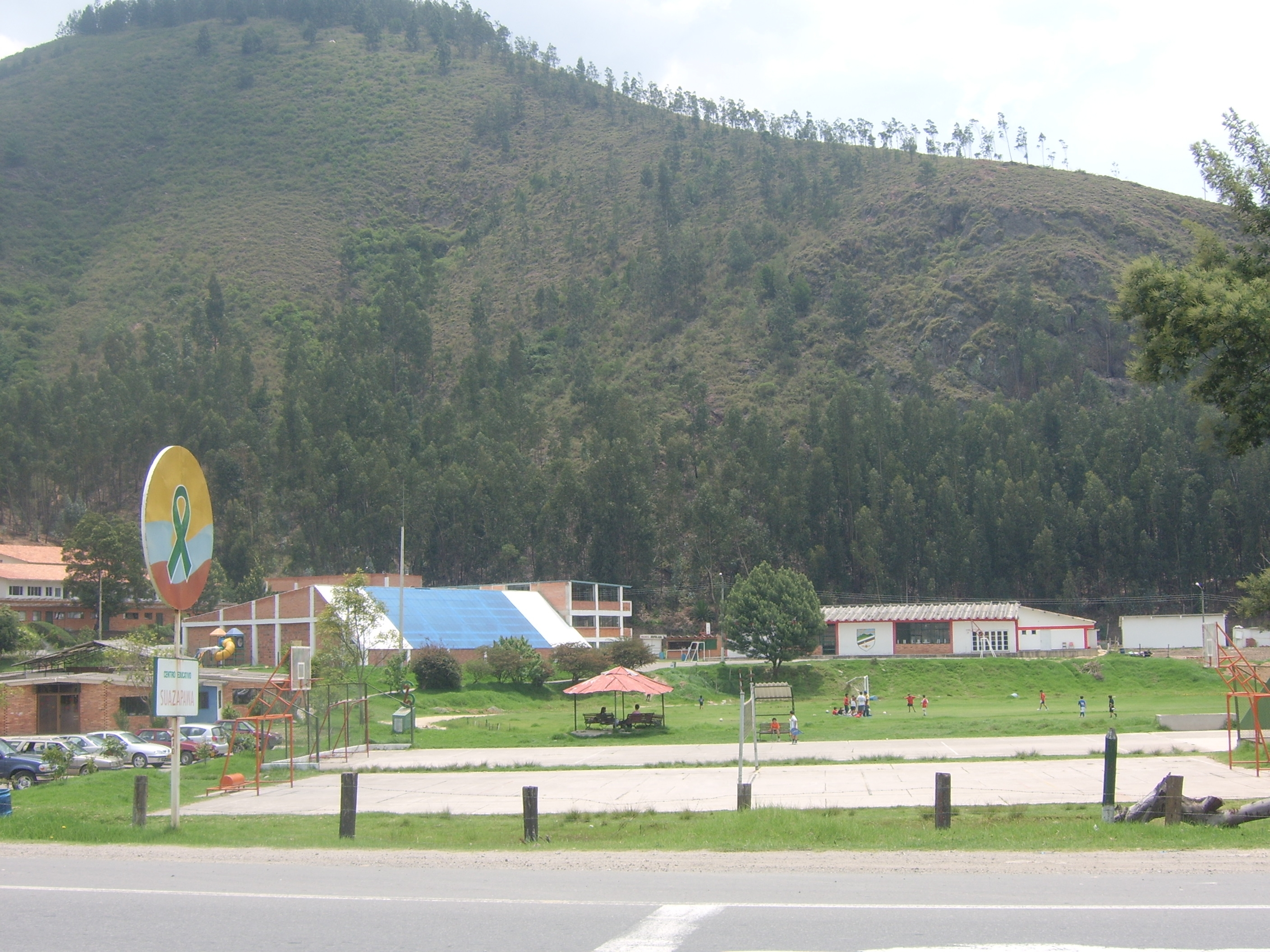
Football pitch and mountain

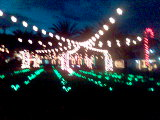
Nobsa by night
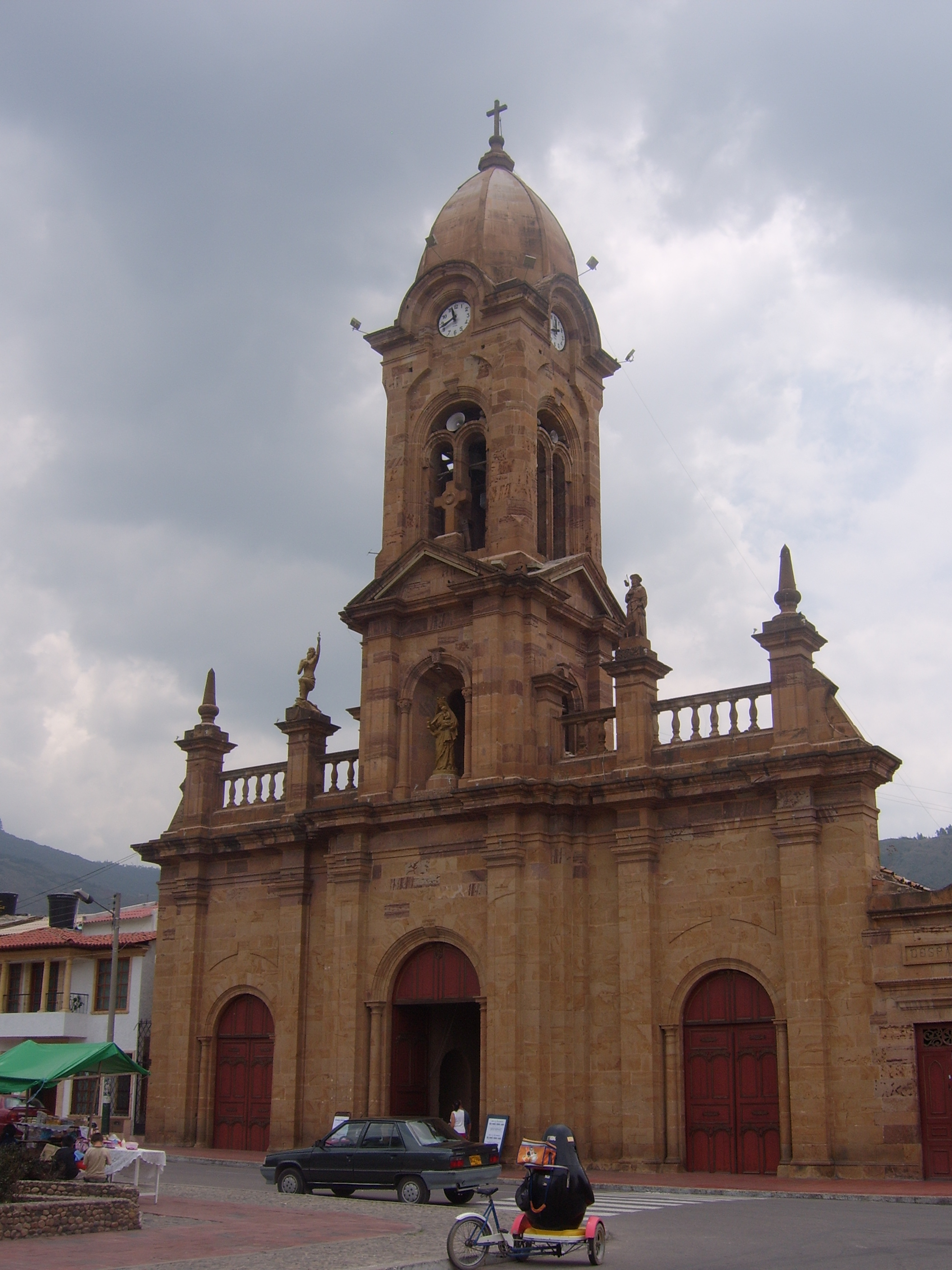
Church of Nobsa

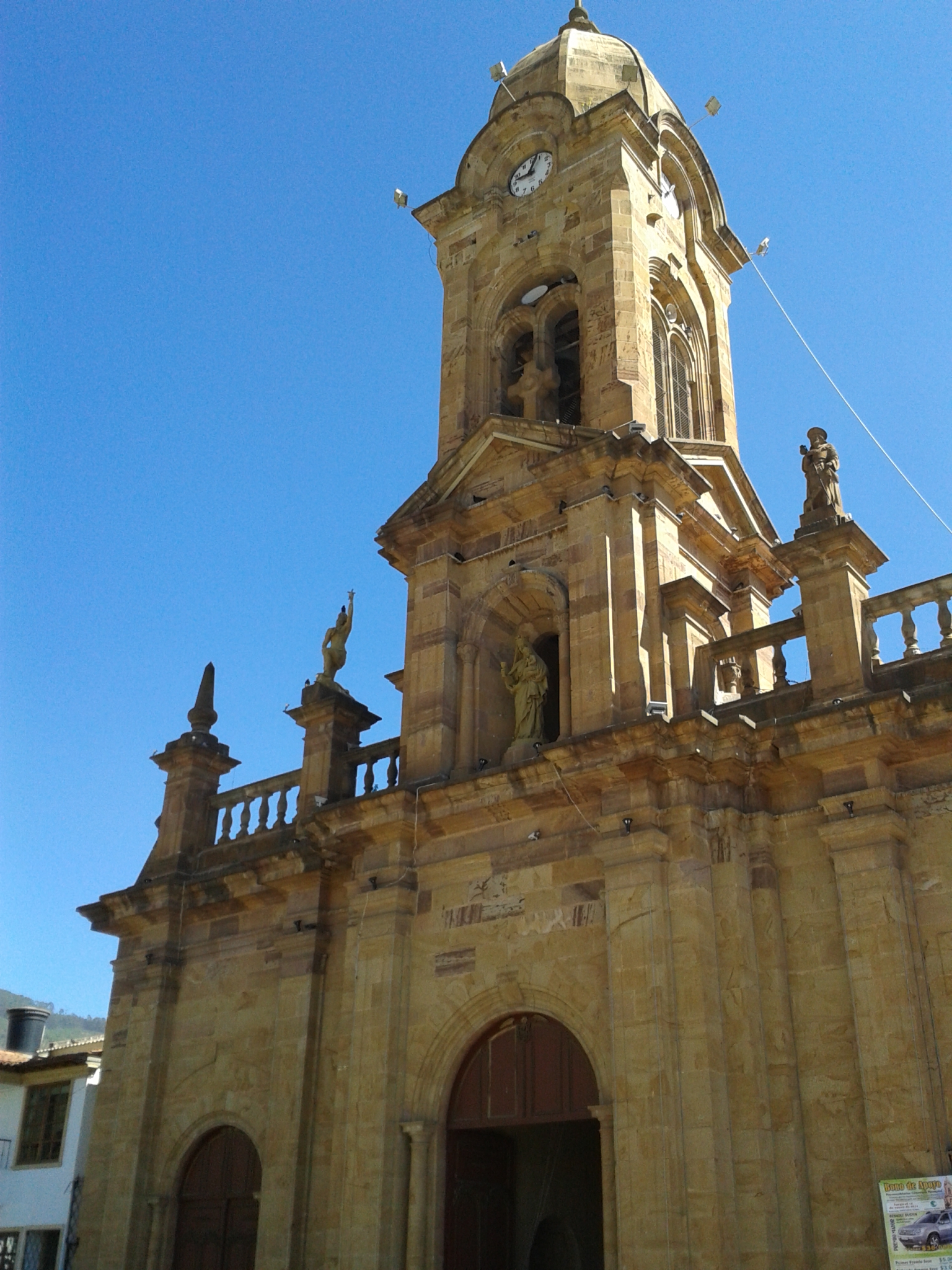
Church

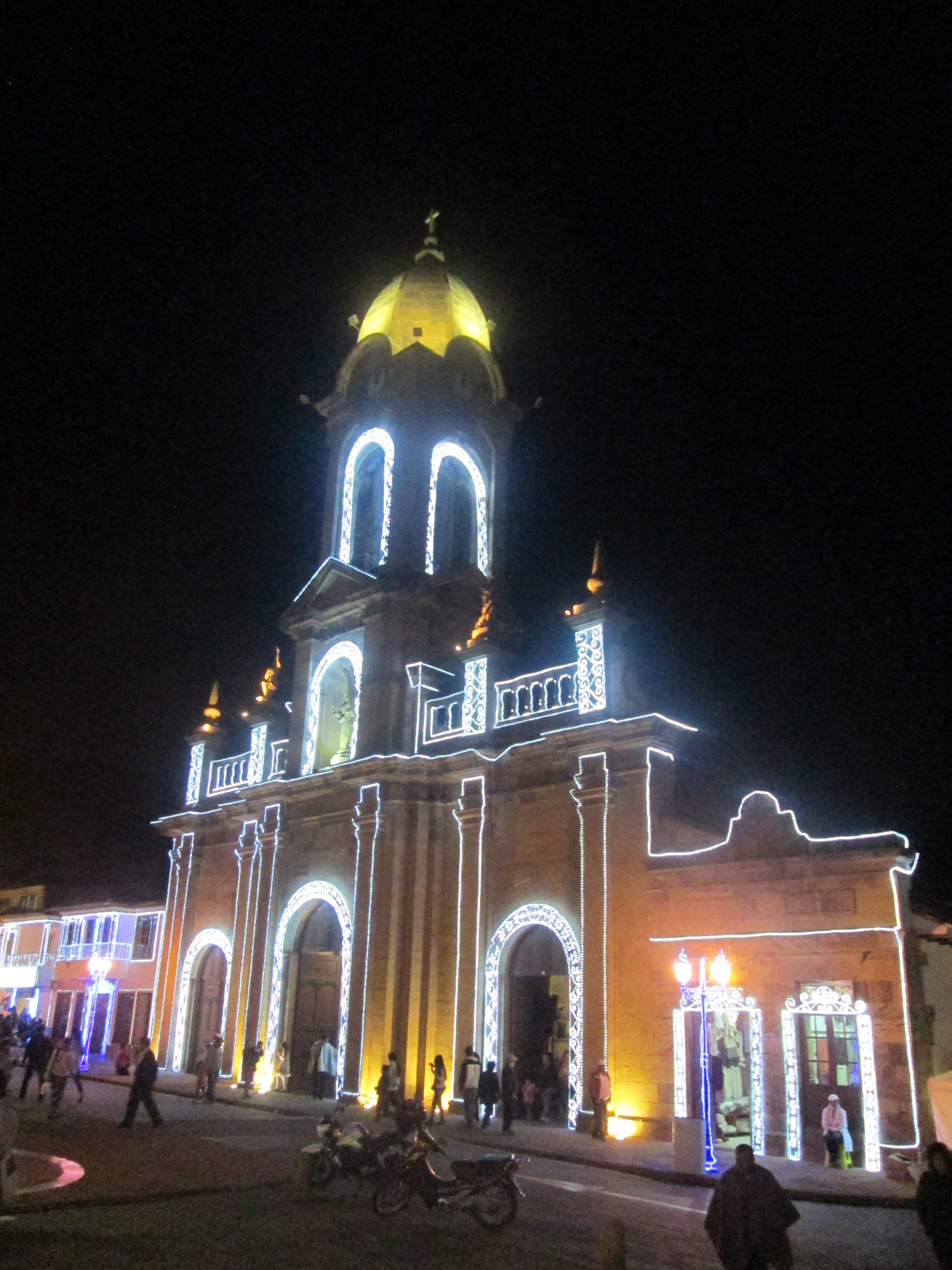
Church by night

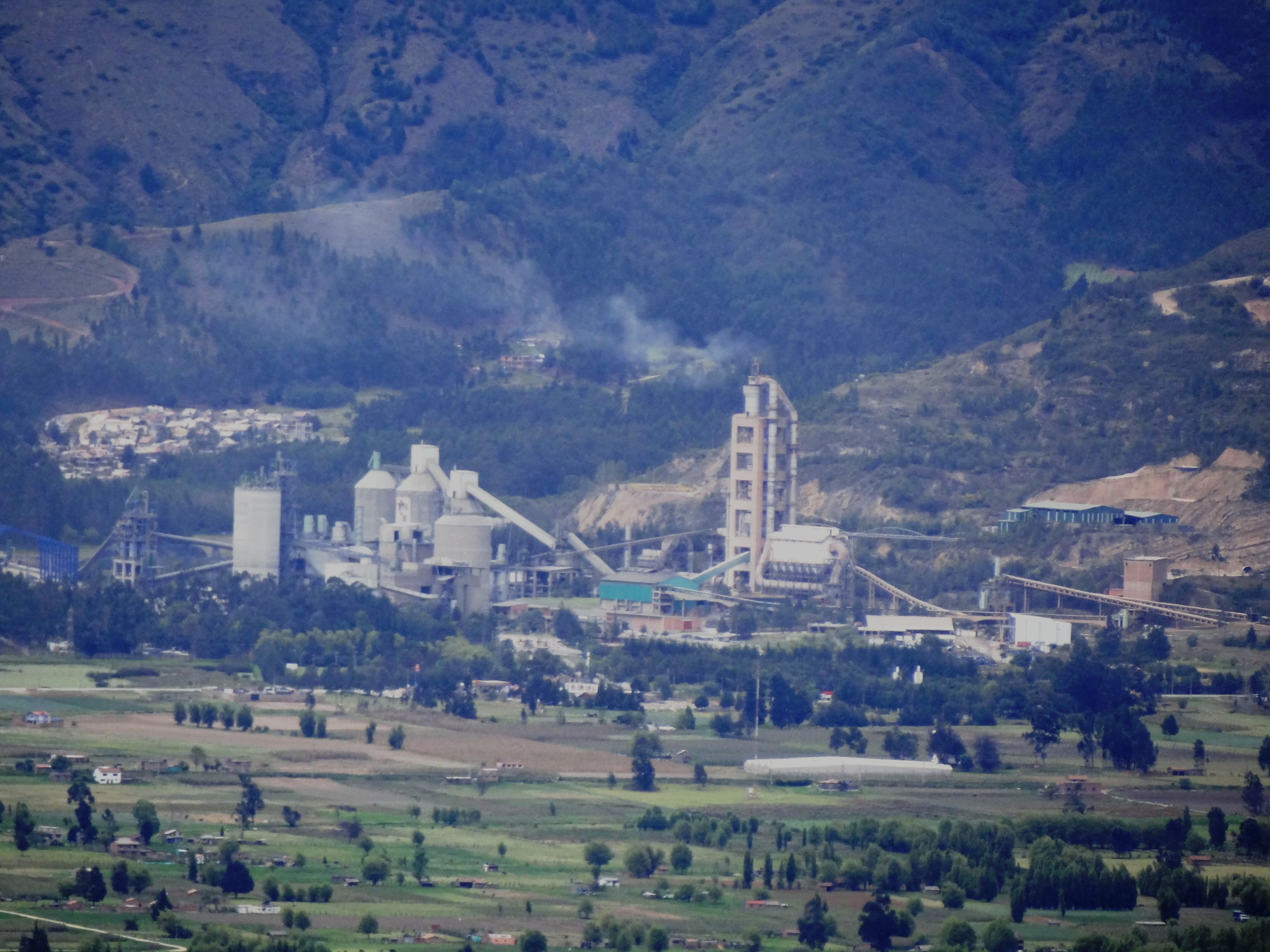
Holcim cement factory
