= Monguí =

Coordinates: 5°45′N 72°50′W

- Municipality and town
- Flag

- Location of the municipality and town of Monguí in the Boyacá Department of Colombia.
- Country: Colombia
- Department: Boyacá Department
- Province: Sugamuxi Province

Government
  - Mayor: Oswaldo Pérez Quiroz (2020-2023)
- Time zone: UTC-5 (Colombia Standard Time)

Monguí is a town and municipality in Boyacá Department, Colombia, part of the Sugamuxi Province a subregion of Boyaca.

It was founded in 1601.

Monguí was named a Pueblo Patrimonio (heritage town) of Colombia in 2010. It is among 11 municipalities nationwide that were selected to be part of the Red Turística de Pueblos Patrimonio original cohort.
