= Tutazá =

Coordinates: 6°03′N 72°52′W

- Municipality and town
- Flag

- Location of the municipality and town of Tutazá in the Boyacá Department of Colombia
- Country: Colombia
- Department: Boyacá Department
- Province: Tundama Province
- Founded: 6 October 1849

Government
  - Mayor: Jhon Alexander Ortiz Sissa (2020-2023)

Area
  - Municipality and town: 135 km^{2} (52 sq mi)
  - Urban: 35 km^{2} (14 sq mi)
- Elevation: 2,700 m (8,900 ft)

Population (2015)
  - Municipality and town: 1,890
  - Density: 14.0/km^{2} (36.3/sq mi)
  - Urban: 195
- Time zone: UTC-5 (Colombia Standard Time)
- Website: Official website

Tutazá or Tutasá, is a town and municipality in the Colombian Department of Boyacá, part of the Tundama Province, a subregion of Boyacá. Tutazá borders the municipalities Belén, Paz de Río, Sativasur and Sativanorte of the department of Boyacá and Onzaga and Coromoro of the department of Santander.

== History ==
Before the Spanish conquest of the Muisca on the Altiplano Cundiboyacense, Tutazá was ruled by a cacique called Tutazúa. He was loyal to the cacique Tundama from the city with the same name, currently known as Duitama. In the Chibcha language of the Muisca Tutaz(u)á means "Son of the Sun".

Although the village was already visited by missionaries from the 17th century, the official foundation was on October 6, 1849. Simón Bolívar visited Tutazá on July 18, 1819.

== Economy ==
Main economical activity of the small village are agriculture (potatoes, maize, beans, peas, barley and wheat) and livestock farming.
