= Flag of Boyacá Department =

Flag of the Department of Boyacá

Department of Boyacá
- Use: Civil and state flag
- Proportion: 2:3
- Adopted: 6 August 1968; 58 years ago June 5, 2008 (amended)
- Designed by: Alfonso Mariño Camargo

The Flag of the Department of Boyacá is the official flag and main symbol of the Colombian Department of Boyacá.

The flag was approved by Ordinance 47 of 1967 and Decrees 218 and 495 of 1968 by the Governor of Boyacá. The flag is similar in dimensions to the flags of Suriname and Thailand.

== Disposition and colors meaning ==
The Flag of Boyacá is made up of five horizontal stripes. The extreme superior (first) and inferior (fifth) stripes of green color occupy a 1/6 of the flag and mean faith, devotion to service, true friendship, respect and the hope of the people of Boyacá, it also symbolizes the fertility of Boyacá's countryside and the emerald green of the land.

The stripes close to the central stripe (second and fourth) colored white are also 1/6 of the flag and mean the love of the people from Boyacá for their homeland, to their thoughtfulness and dedicated and decisive virtues to maintain the unity of the territory.

The central red stripe occupies 1/3 of the flag and symbolizes the blood of those who sacrificed their lives during the War of Independence from Spain in the fields of Tame, Pisba, Socha, Gámeza, in the Battle of Boyacá.

== The Oak leaves ==
An expansion in the symbology of the Flag with the inclusion of the Oak leaf, in white, placed in the center of the red stripe of the flag. The Oak (Quercus humboldtii) is the flagship tree of Boyacá, whose forests extend across more than 20 municipalities was approved by Ordinance No. 008 of June 5, 2008 by the Governor of Boyacá and its Assembly. The oak leave symbolizes the character, strength and willingness of the people of Boyacá.
