= Valderrama Province =

Valderrama Province Provincia de Valderrama
- Province
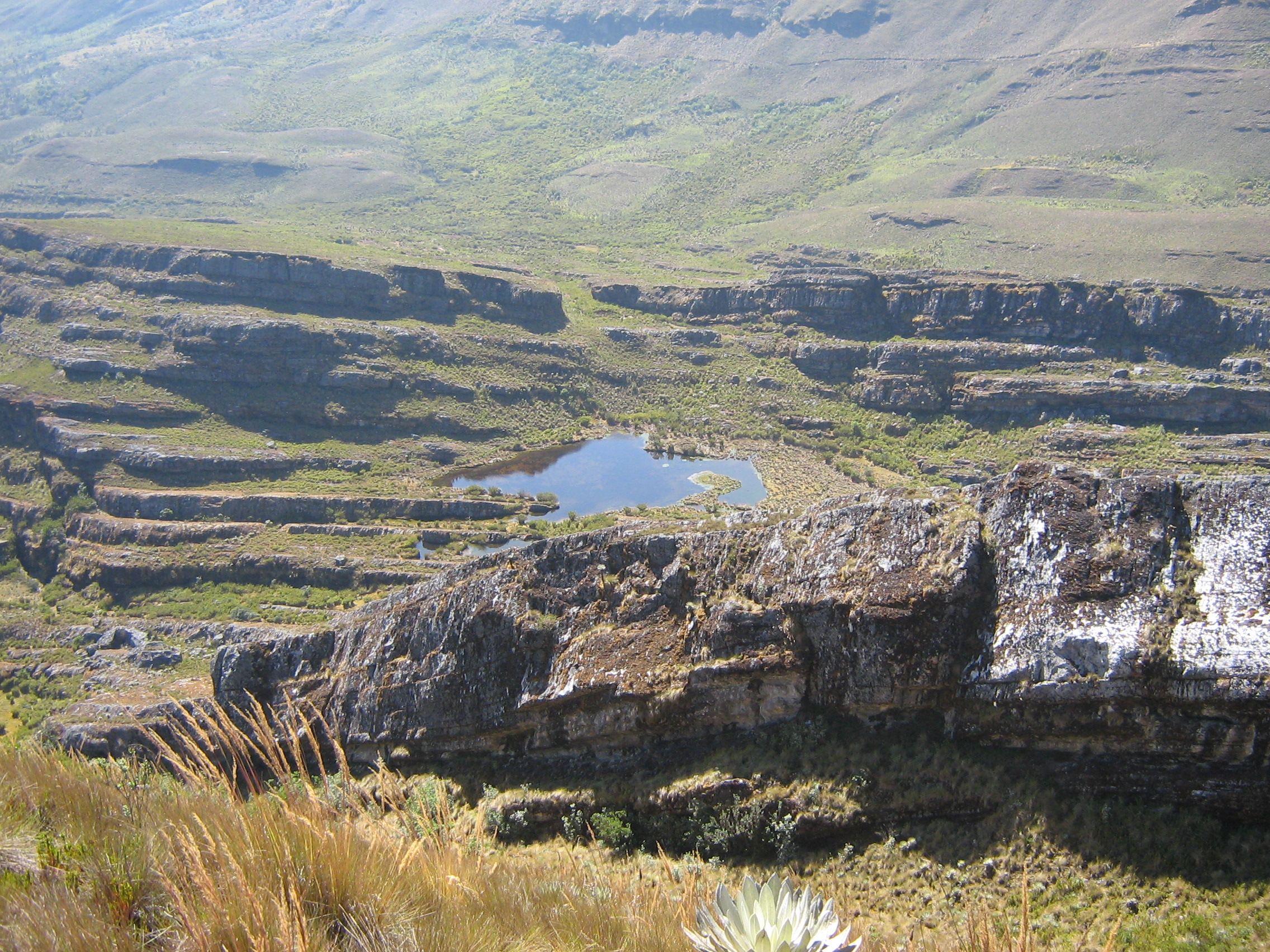
- Pisba Páramo
- Etymology: Antonio Valderrama
- Location of Valderrama Province in Colombia
- Coordinates: 6°00′00″N 72°40′00″W
- Country: Colombia
- Department: Boyacá
- Capital: Socha
- Municipalities: 7

Area
  - Total: 1,597 km^{2} (617 sq mi)
- Time zone: UTC−5 (COT)
- Indigenous groups: Muisca; Lache

The Valderrama Province is a subregion of the Colombian Department of Boyacá. The subregion is formed by 7 municipalities. The province is named after Antonio Valderrama.

== Municipalities ==
Betéitiva • Chita • Jericó • Paz de Río • Socotá • Socha • Tasco
