= Paz de Río =

Coordinates: 5°59′N 72°45′W

- Municipality and town
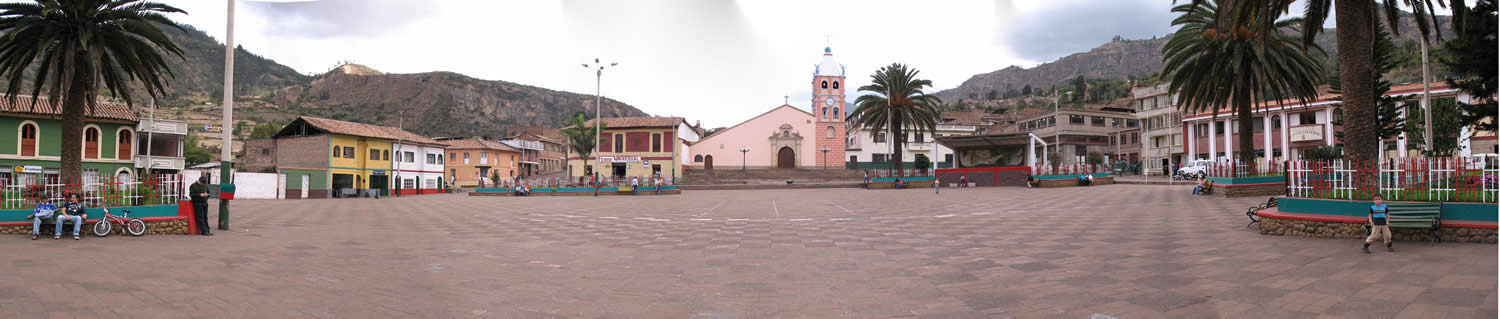
- View of Paz de Río

- Flag

- Location of the municipality and town of Paz de Río in the Boyacá department of Colombia
- Country: Colombia
- Department: Boyacá Department
- Province: Valderrama Province
- Founded: 20 July 1935
- Founder: Marco Antonio Mejía Gómez

Government
  - Mayor: Edward Edixon Archila González (2020-2023)

Area
  - Municipality and town: 116 km^{2} (45 sq mi)
  - Urban: 38.7 km^{2} (14.9 sq mi)
- Elevation: 2,200 m (7,200 ft)

Population (2015)
  - Municipality and town: 4,680
  - Density: 40.3/km^{2} (104/sq mi)
  - Urban: 2,920
- Time zone: UTC-5 (Colombia Standard Time)
- Website: Official website

Paz de Río is a town and municipality in the Valderrama Province, part of the Colombian department of Boyacá. The urban centre of Paz de Río, situated on the Altiplano Cundiboyacense, is located at an elevation of 2,200 metres (7,200 ft), and the elevation within the municipality ranges from 2,150 metres (7,050 ft) to 3,600 metres (11,800 ft). The municipality borders Sativanorte and Sativasur in the north, Betéitiva and Tasco in the south, Sativasur and Socha in the east and Belén and Tutazá in the west.

== History ==
In the times before the Spanish conquest, Paz de Río was inhabited by the Muisca. The original name of the village, now the name of a vereda, Chitagoto is taken from cacique Chitagoto, who was loyal to the Tundama of Tundama.

Modern Paz de Río was not founded until July 20, 1935 by Marco Antonio Mejía Gómez.

== Economy ==
The main economical activity of Paz de Río is agriculture, predominantly potatoes and onions. Other products are maize, wheat and barley.
