= Socotá =

Coordinates: 6°03′N 72°38′W

- Municipality and town
- Flag Coat of arms

- Location of the municipality and town of Socotá in the Boyacá Department of Colombia
- Country: Colombia
- Department: Boyacá Department
- Province: Valderrama Province
- Founded: 19 January 1602
- Founder: Gonzalo Sánchez de Flandes

Government
  - Mayor: William Eusebio Correa Durán (2020-2023)

Area
  - Municipality and town: 600.11 km^{2} (231.70 sq mi)
  - Urban: 1 km^{2} (0.39 sq mi)
- Elevation: 2,443 m (8,015 ft)

Population (2015)
  - Municipality and town: 9,812
  - Density: 16.35/km^{2} (42.35/sq mi)
  - Urban: 1,095
- Time zone: UTC-5 (Colombia Standard Time)
- Website: Official website

Socotá is a town and municipality in the Valderrama Province, part of the Colombian department of Boyacá. The municipality is situated in the Eastern Ranges of the Colombian Andes. The urban centre is at an altitude of 2,443 metres (8,015 ft) at a distance of 134 kilometres (83 mi) from the department capital Tunja. It borders Jericó and Sativanorte in the north, Pisba and Mongua in the south, Chita and Támara, Casanare in the east and Sativasur, Tasco, Socha and Gámeza in the west.

== Etymology ==
The name Socotá comes from Chibcha and means either "Land of the Sun and farmfields" or "Good harvest".

== History ==
Before the Spanish conquest, Socotá was the northeasternmost part of the loose Muisca Confederation. It was ruled either by the iraca of Sugamuxi or by the Tundama based in Tundama.

Modern Socotá was founded on January 19, 1602 by Gonzalo Sanchez de Flandes.

== Economy ==
Main economic activity of Socotá is livestock farming and on a minor scale coal mining.

== Named after Socotá ==
- Socotá Formation, Lower Cretaceous sandstone and shale formation

== Climate ==
Climate data for Socotá (Cardon El), elevation 3,590 m (11,780 ft), (1981–2010)
| Month | Jan | Feb | Mar | Apr | May | Jun | Jul | Aug | Sep | Oct | Nov | Dec | Year |
|---|---|---|---|---|---|---|---|---|---|---|---|---|---|
| Mean daily maximum °C (°F) | 10.8 (51.4) | 10.8 (51.4) | 10.7 (51.3) | 9.8 (49.6) | 9.5 (49.1) | 8.6 (47.5) | 8.0 (46.4) | 8.1 (46.6) | 8.5 (47.3) | 9.2 (48.6) | 10.0 (50.0) | 10.6 (51.1) | 9.5 (49.1) |
| Daily mean °C (°F) | 6.6 (43.9) | 6.5 (43.7) | 6.6 (43.9) | 6.6 (43.9) | 6.5 (43.7) | 5.9 (42.6) | 5.4 (41.7) | 5.4 (41.7) | 5.7 (42.3) | 6.2 (43.2) | 6.6 (43.9) | 6.6 (43.9) | 6.2 (43.2) |
| Mean daily minimum °C (°F) | 2.9 (37.2) | 3.0 (37.4) | 3.5 (38.3) | 4.1 (39.4) | 4.0 (39.2) | 3.5 (38.3) | 3.1 (37.6) | 3.2 (37.8) | 3.3 (37.9) | 3.6 (38.5) | 3.7 (38.7) | 3.1 (37.6) | 3.4 (38.1) |
| Average precipitation mm (inches) | 33.3 (1.31) | 60.6 (2.39) | 89.0 (3.50) | 207.7 (8.18) | 301.1 (11.85) | 379.7 (14.95) | 446.0 (17.56) | 367.7 (14.48) | 251.8 (9.91) | 196.8 (7.75) | 114.9 (4.52) | 61.0 (2.40) | 2,509.5 (98.80) |
| Average precipitation days (≥ 1.0 mm) | 9 | 13 | 18 | 24 | 27 | 28 | 29 | 30 | 28 | 27 | 22 | 15 | 266 |
| Average relative humidity (%) | 87 | 87 | 90 | 95 | 96 | 97 | 97 | 97 | 96 | 94 | 93 | 89 | 93 |
Source: Instituto de Hidrologia Meteorologia y Estudios Ambientales
