= Olimpo López =

Colombian pastry chef

- Born: Olimpo López Cáceres; 24 June 1918; Jericó, Boyacá, Colombia
- Died: 16 October 2015 (aged 97); Mosquera, Cundinamarca, Colombia
- Other name: Don Olimpo
- Occupation: pastry chef

Olimpo López Cáceres (June 24, 1918 – October 16, 2015) was a Colombian pastry chef. He was nicknamed "Don Olimpo" by Colombians. López was the creator of the Chocoramo, a packaged square-shaped cake coated in chocolate, as well as the Ponqué Gala. Both desserts are popular treats manufactured by Productos Ramo, a Colombian snack food company which was founded by Rafael Molano, who died in 2014. Lopez's original, secret recipe for the Chocoramo is currently stored in a bank in the United States.

He was born in Jericó, Boyacá Department, Colombia, on June 24, 1918. He was raised by his mother, Evangelina Gómez, who taught him how to make pastries.

López first met Rafael Molano, the founder of Productos Ramo, during the 1940s. In 1968, López began working at Molano's factory in Mosquera, Cundinamarca, as a manager and developer of new snack products. The first new dessert he created was the Ponqué Gala. Then, in the early 1970s, López developed the recipe for the Chocoramo, a cake enrobed in a coating of chocolate. Chocoramo proved popular with consumers and become one of Productos Ramo's signature products.

Productos Ramo now produces approximately 700,000 Chocoramos per day, or 242 million of the chocolate covered cakes annually.

Olimpo López died in Mosquera, Cundinamarca Department, Colombia, on October 16, 2015, at the age of 97.
