= Betéitiva =

Coordinates: 5°55′N 72°49′W

- Municipality and town
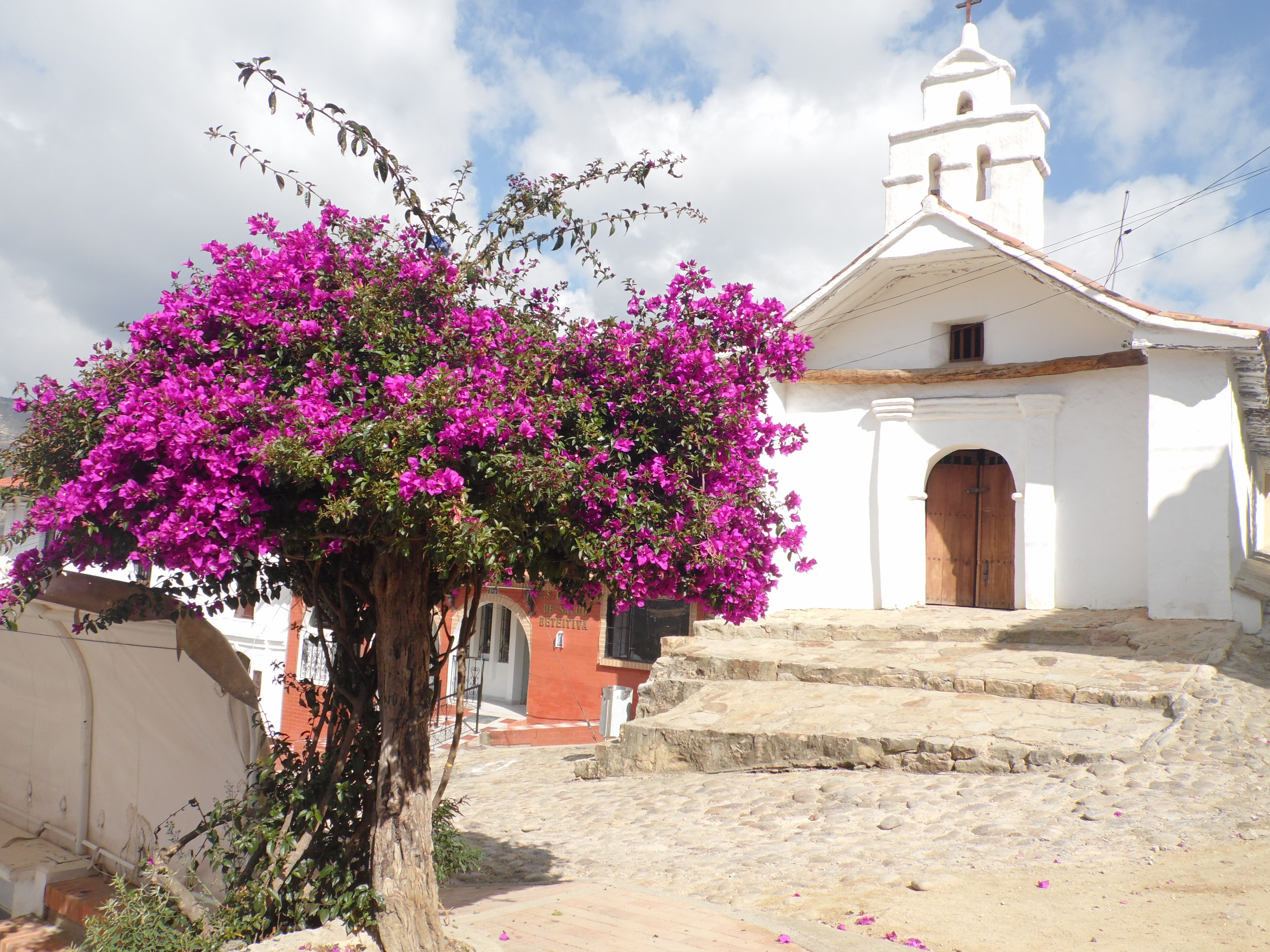
- Chapel of Betéitiva

- Flag

- Location of the municipality and town of Beteitiva in the Boyacá department of Colombia
- Country: Colombia
- Department: Boyacá Department
- Province: Valderrama Province
- Founded: 14 October 1556
- Founder: Juan Salamanca

Government
  - Mayor: Ricardo Cristancho Fernández (2024-2027)

Area
  - Municipality and town: 123 km^{2} (47 sq mi)
  - Urban: 6 km^{2} (2.3 sq mi)
- Elevation: 2,575 m (8,448 ft)

Population (2025)
  - Municipality and town: 2,083
  - Density: 16.9/km^{2} (43.9/sq mi)
  - Urban: 389
- Time zone: UTC-5 (Colombia Standard Time)
- Website: Official website

Betéitiva (Spanish pronunciation: [beˈtejtiβa]) a town and municipality in the Valderrama Province, part of the Colombian department of Boyacá. The urban centre of Betétiva is situated at 250 kilometres (160 mi) from the capital Bogotá, 110 kilometres (68 mi) from the department capital Tunja and 45 kilometres (28 mi) from Sogamoso. The municipality, located on the Altiplano Cundiboyacense, borders in the north Belén, in the northeast Paz de Río, in the east Tasco, in the southeast Corrales and in the west with Busbanzá and Cerinza.

== Etymology ==
The name Betéitiva is derived from the Chibcha name of the cacique Betacín of the village and means "chief of the anchovy". According to Muisca myths, Betacín fell in love with the daughter of the iraca of Sugamuxi and after her dismissal he retreated in the area now known as Betéitiva.

== History ==
The area of Betéitiva before the Spanish conquest was inhabited by the Muisca, organized in their loose Muisca Confederation. Different rulers were reigning the central highlands of the Colombian Andes and Betéitiva was ruled by cacique Betacín.

Modern Betéitiva was founded on October 14, 1556 by Juan Salamanca.

== Economy ==
Potatoes and dairy farming are the most important economical activities of the municipality.

== Climate ==
Climate data for Betéitiva, elevation 2,575 m (8,448 ft), (1981–2010)
Month	Jan	Feb	Mar	Apr	May	Jun	Jul	Aug	Sep	Oct	Nov	Dec	Year
Mean daily maximum °C (°F)	23.2 (73.8)	23.8 (74.8)	23.2 (73.8)	23.3 (73.9)	22.5 (72.5)	21.9 (71.4)	21.7 (71.1)	22.0 (71.6)	22.1 (71.8)	22.6 (72.7)	22.3 (72.1)	22.6 (72.7)	22.6 (72.7)
Daily mean °C (°F)	15.2 (59.4)	15.5 (59.9)	15.4 (59.7)	15.6 (60.1)	15.5 (59.9)	15.2 (59.4)	14.8 (58.6)	14.9 (58.8)	14.8 (58.6)	15.1 (59.2)	15.2 (59.4)	15.3 (59.5)	15.2 (59.4)
Mean daily minimum °C (°F)	8.2 (46.8)	8.3 (46.9)	8.7 (47.7)	9.4 (48.9)	9.4 (48.9)	9.5 (49.1)	9.0 (48.2)	9.3 (48.7)	8.8 (47.8)	9.2 (48.6)	9.4 (48.9)	8.6 (47.5)	9.0 (48.2)
Average precipitation mm (inches)	34.5 (1.36)	43.9 (1.73)	72.0 (2.83)	91.0 (3.58)	82.6 (3.25)	52.3 (2.06)	52.4 (2.06)	52.6 (2.07)	70.3 (2.77)	85.9 (3.38)	93.5 (3.68)	50.6 (1.99)	748.9 (29.48)
Average precipitation days (≥ 1.0 mm)	8	7	11	13	15	13	15	14	14	15	13	9	140
Average relative humidity (%)	77	76	81	81	81	81	81	81	80	80	82	80	80
Source: Instituto de Hidrologia Meteorologia y Estudios Ambientales
