= Cubará =

- Municipality and town
- Flag Coat of arms

- Location of the municipality and town of Cubará in the Boyacá Department of Colombia.

- Location in Colombia
- Coordinates: 7°02′N 72°04′W
- Country: Colombia
- Department: Boyacá Department
- Province: Boyacá Frontier District

Government
  - Mayor: Aura Benilda Tegria Cristancho (2020-2023)
- Elevation: 380 m (1,250 ft)
- Time zone: UTC-5 (Colombia Standard Time)

Cubará is a town and municipality in Boyacá Department, Colombia also referred to as the Boyacá Frontier District for sharing an international border with the Bolivarian Republic of Venezuela.

== Climate ==
Cubará has a very wet tropical rainforest climate (Af).

Climate data for Cubará (Tunebia), elevation 370 m (1,210 ft), (1981–2010)
Month	Jan	Feb	Mar	Apr	May	Jun	Jul	Aug	Sep	Oct	Nov	Dec	Year
Mean daily maximum °C (°F)	29.3 (84.7)	29.6 (85.3)	29.6 (85.3)	29.6 (85.3)	29.6 (85.3)	28.8 (83.8)	28.5 (83.3)	29.1 (84.4)	30.0 (86.0)	30.2 (86.4)	30.0 (86.0)	29.5 (85.1)	29.5 (85.1)
Daily mean °C (°F)	23.9 (75.0)	24.1 (75.4)	24.3 (75.7)	24.5 (76.1)	24.5 (76.1)	23.9 (75.0)	23.7 (74.7)	24.1 (75.4)	24.6 (76.3)	24.9 (76.8)	24.8 (76.6)	24.3 (75.7)	24.3 (75.7)
Mean daily minimum °C (°F)	19.2 (66.6)	19.6 (67.3)	20.2 (68.4)	20.7 (69.3)	20.7 (69.3)	20.4 (68.7)	20.3 (68.5)	20.6 (69.1)	20.5 (68.9)	20.5 (68.9)	20.4 (68.7)	20.1 (68.2)	20.2 (68.4)
Average precipitation mm (inches)	161.1 (6.34)	199.4 (7.85)	228.4 (8.99)	379.7 (14.95)	575.7 (22.67)	659.8 (25.98)	633.4 (24.94)	651.3 (25.64)	519.5 (20.45)	435.4 (17.14)	332.3 (13.08)	225.4 (8.87)	4,926.4 (193.95)
Average precipitation days (≥ 1.0 mm)	12	14	16	21	23	25	25	25	22	21	19	15	231
Average relative humidity (%)	82	82	82	85	86	87	87	87	86	84	84	84	85
Source: Instituto de Hidrologia Meteorologia y Estudios Ambientales
