= Postage stamps and postal history of Boyacá =

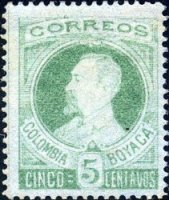
1902 issue of Boyaca depicting Diego Mendoza Pérez

Boyacá is a department of Colombia, one of the original nine states of the United States of Colombia.

== Postage stamps ==
Although Boyacá had the right to issue its own postage stamps, it used the stamps of Colombia until 1902, when it issued a 5c stamp honouring Diego Mendoza Pérez. It issued a total of 15 stamps, of which 9 varieties are known and also two tete beche pairs (of the 10 Pesos 1903 issue). The last issue dates from 1904. The stamps themselves remain commonly available, but authentic uses on covers are rare, eight covers are known of which one bearing an imperforate 1902 issue.

== References and sources ==
=== Sources ===
- Encyclopaedia of Postal Authorities
- 2009 Scott Standard Stamp Catalogue. Vol. 2. New York. 2008. pp. 461–462.
- Stanley Gibbons Ltd: Stamp Catalogue Part 20: South America (2008)
- Rossiter, Stuart & John Flower. The Stamp Atlas. London: Macdonald, 1986. ISBN 0-356-10862-7
