= Socha =

Coordinates: 6°00′N 72°40′W

- Municipality and town
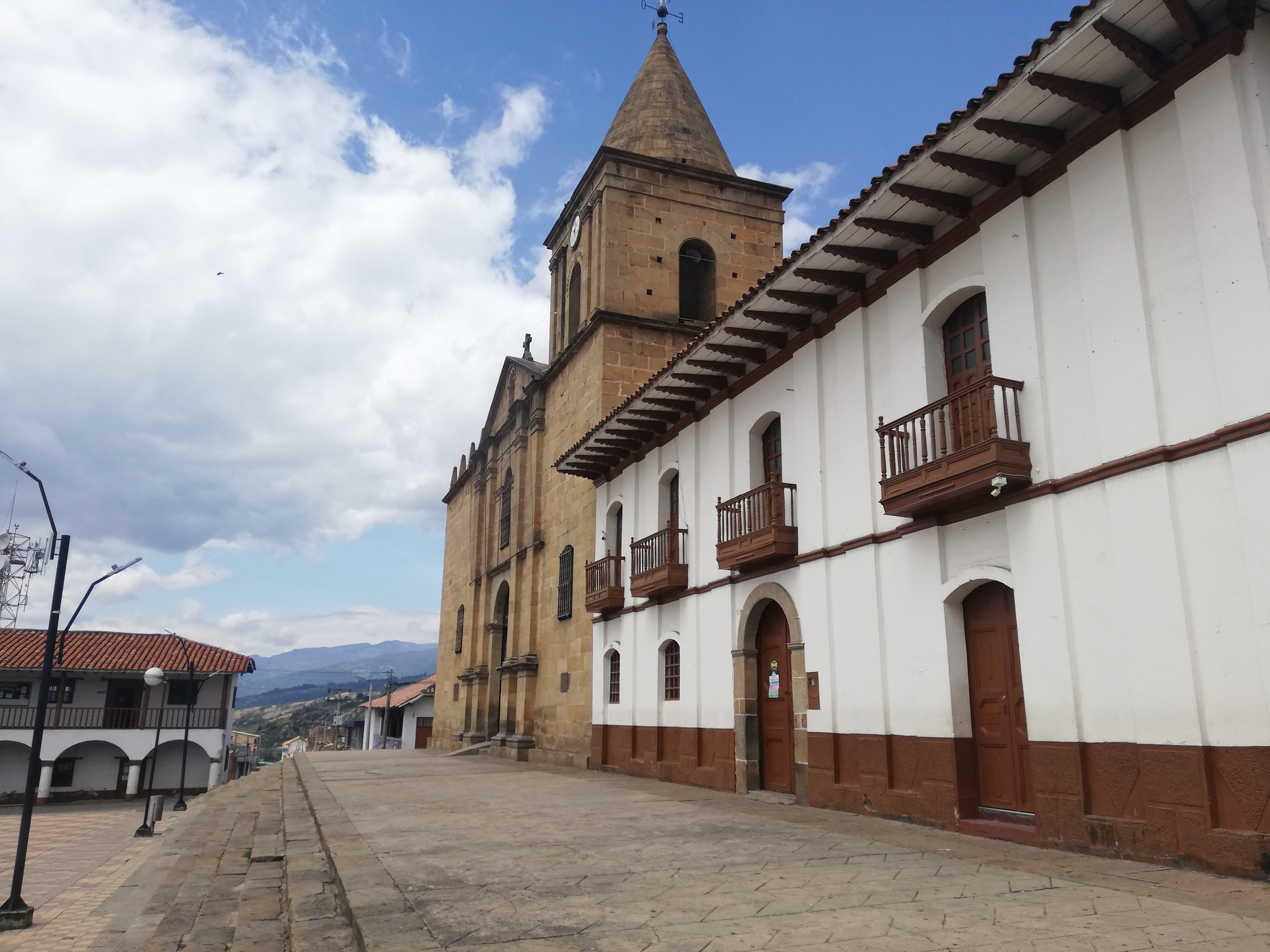

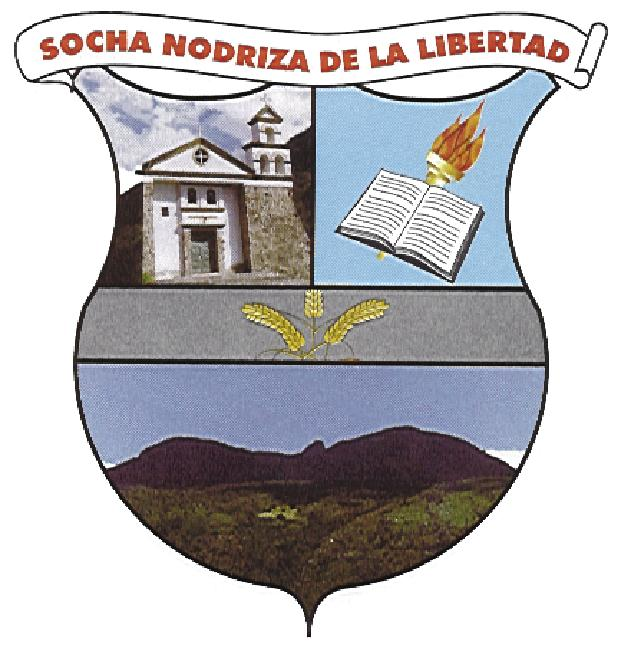
- Flag Coat of arms

- Location of the municipality and town of Socha in the Boyacá Department of Colombia.
- Country: Colombia
- Department: Boyacá Department
- Province: Valderrama Province
- Founded: 22 October 1540

Government
  - Mayor: Zandra María Bernal Rincón (2020–2023)

Area
  - Municipality and town: 151 km^{2} (58 sq mi)
  - Urban: 1.5 km^{2} (0.58 sq mi)
- Elevation: 2,669 m (8,757 ft)

Population (2015)
  - Municipality and town: 7,140
  - Density: 47.3/km^{2} (122/sq mi)
  - Urban: 3,836
- Time zone: UTC-5 (Colombia Standard Time)
- Website: Official website

Socha is a town and municipality in the Colombian Department of Boyacá, part of the Valderrama Province, which is a subregion of Boyacá. It borders Socotá in the east, Sativasur in the north, Tasco in the south and in the west Paz de Río.

== Geography ==
The village is located in the Eastern Ranges at altitudes between 2,600 metres (8,500 ft) and 4,000 metres (13,000 ft). Socha is the largest municipality in the Pisba National Natural Park. The Chicamocha River forms the northern boundary of Socha.

== History ==
Before the Spanish conquest of the Muisca on the Altiplano Cundiboyacense, Socha was inhabited by the indigenous Pirgua and Boche tribes, belonging to the Muisca.

Simón Bolívar passed through Socha in his march for the independence of Colombia. The town center was moved in 1870 due to a landslide. Close to the Boche waterfall in the municipality petroglyphs have been found.

The name Socha is derived from the Chibcha words So ("Sun"; Sué) and Cha ("Moon"; Chía), "Land of the Sun and the Moon".

== Economy ==
Main economical activity of Socha is coal and sandstone mining. To a lesser extent also livestock farming and agriculture are executed.

== Born in Socha ==
- Fernando Soto Aparicio, Colombian poet
