= Tasco, Boyacá =

Coordinates: 5°55′N 72°47′W

Tasco
- Municipality and town
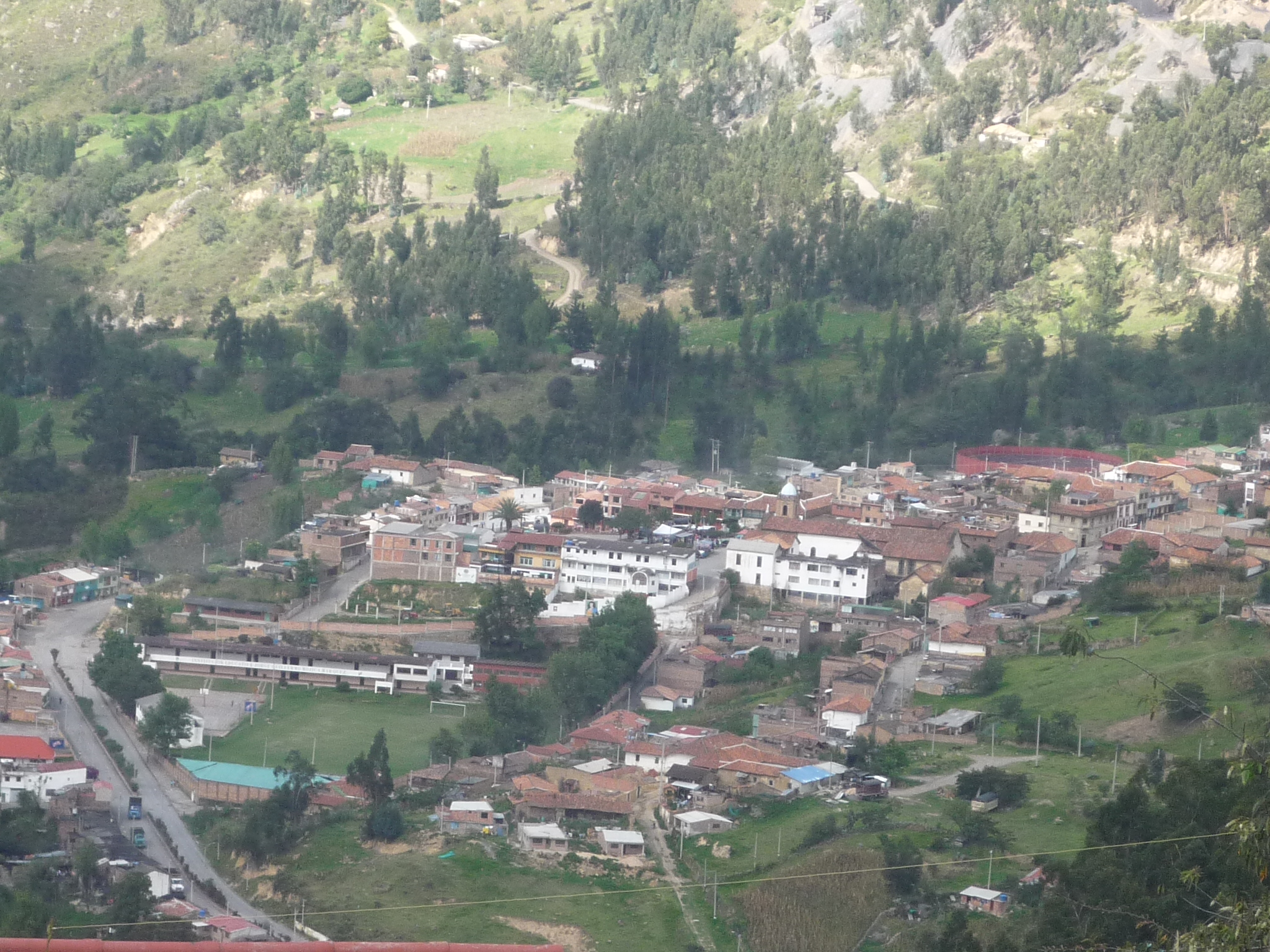
- View of Tasco

- Flag

- Location of the municipality and town of Tasco in the Boyacá Department of Colombia
- Country: Colombia
- Department: Boyacá Department
- Province: Valderrama Province
- Founded: 15 October 1577

Government
  - Mayor: Juan Yesid Cusba Tibaduiza (2020-2023)

Area
  - Municipality and town: 167 km^{2} (64 sq mi)
  - Urban: 0.3 km^{2} (0.12 sq mi)
- Elevation: 2,530 m (8,300 ft)

Population (2015)
  - Municipality and town: 6,361
  - Density: 38.1/km^{2} (98.7/sq mi)
  - Urban: 1,905
- Time zone: UTC-5 (Colombia Standard Time)
- Website: Official website

Tasco is a town and municipality in the Valderrama Province, part of the Colombian department of Boyacá. Tasco is situated on the Altiplano Cundiboyacense at altitudes ranging from 2,400 metres (7,900 ft) to 3,800 metres (12,500 ft). The Chicamocha River flows through the municipality which borders Socha in the north, Corrales and Gámeza in the south, Socotá in the east and Betéitiva and Paz de Río in the west. The urban centre is located at an altitude of 2,530 metres (8,300 ft) at 115 kilometres (71 mi) from the department capital Tunja.

== Etymology ==
Tasco in the Chibcha language of the Muisca means "Enclosure or mansion of the sovereign".

== History ==
The area of Tasco was inhabited by the Boche and Pirgua tribes, before the Spanish conquest of the Muisca. Modern Tasco was founded on October 15, 1577. Mummies have been encountered in Tasco.

== Economy ==
Main economical activities of Tasco are agriculture and livestock farming. Among the agricultural products are potatoes, Ullucus tuberosus, turnips, maize, beans, barley, peas and chick peas. Fruits cultivated in Tasco are peaches, pears, prunes, apples and the Colombian fruit curuba.

== Paleontology ==
Fossil remains of the Rosidae Berhamniphyllum and Archaeopaliurus boyacensis have been found in the Maastrichtian Guaduas Formation in Tasco and described in 2010.

== Climate ==
Climate data for Betéitiva/Tasco, elevation 2,575 m (8,448 ft), (1981–2010)
Month	Jan	Feb	Mar	Apr	May	Jun	Jul	Aug	Sep	Oct	Nov	Dec	Year
Mean daily maximum °C (°F)	23.2 (73.8)	23.8 (74.8)	23.2 (73.8)	23.3 (73.9)	22.5 (72.5)	21.9 (71.4)	21.7 (71.1)	22.0 (71.6)	22.1 (71.8)	22.6 (72.7)	22.3 (72.1)	22.6 (72.7)	22.6 (72.7)
Daily mean °C (°F)	15.2 (59.4)	15.5 (59.9)	15.4 (59.7)	15.6 (60.1)	15.5 (59.9)	15.2 (59.4)	14.8 (58.6)	14.9 (58.8)	14.8 (58.6)	15.1 (59.2)	15.2 (59.4)	15.3 (59.5)	15.2 (59.4)
Mean daily minimum °C (°F)	8.2 (46.8)	8.3 (46.9)	8.7 (47.7)	9.4 (48.9)	9.4 (48.9)	9.5 (49.1)	9.0 (48.2)	9.3 (48.7)	8.8 (47.8)	9.2 (48.6)	9.4 (48.9)	8.6 (47.5)	9.0 (48.2)
Average precipitation mm (inches)	34.5 (1.36)	43.9 (1.73)	72.0 (2.83)	91.0 (3.58)	82.6 (3.25)	52.3 (2.06)	52.4 (2.06)	52.6 (2.07)	70.3 (2.77)	85.9 (3.38)	93.5 (3.68)	50.6 (1.99)	748.9 (29.48)
Average precipitation days (≥ 1.0 mm)	8	7	11	13	15	13	15	14	14	15	13	9	140
Average relative humidity (%)	77	76	81	81	81	81	81	81	80	80	82	80	80
Source: Instituto de Hidrologia Meteorologia y Estudios Ambientales

== Gallery ==
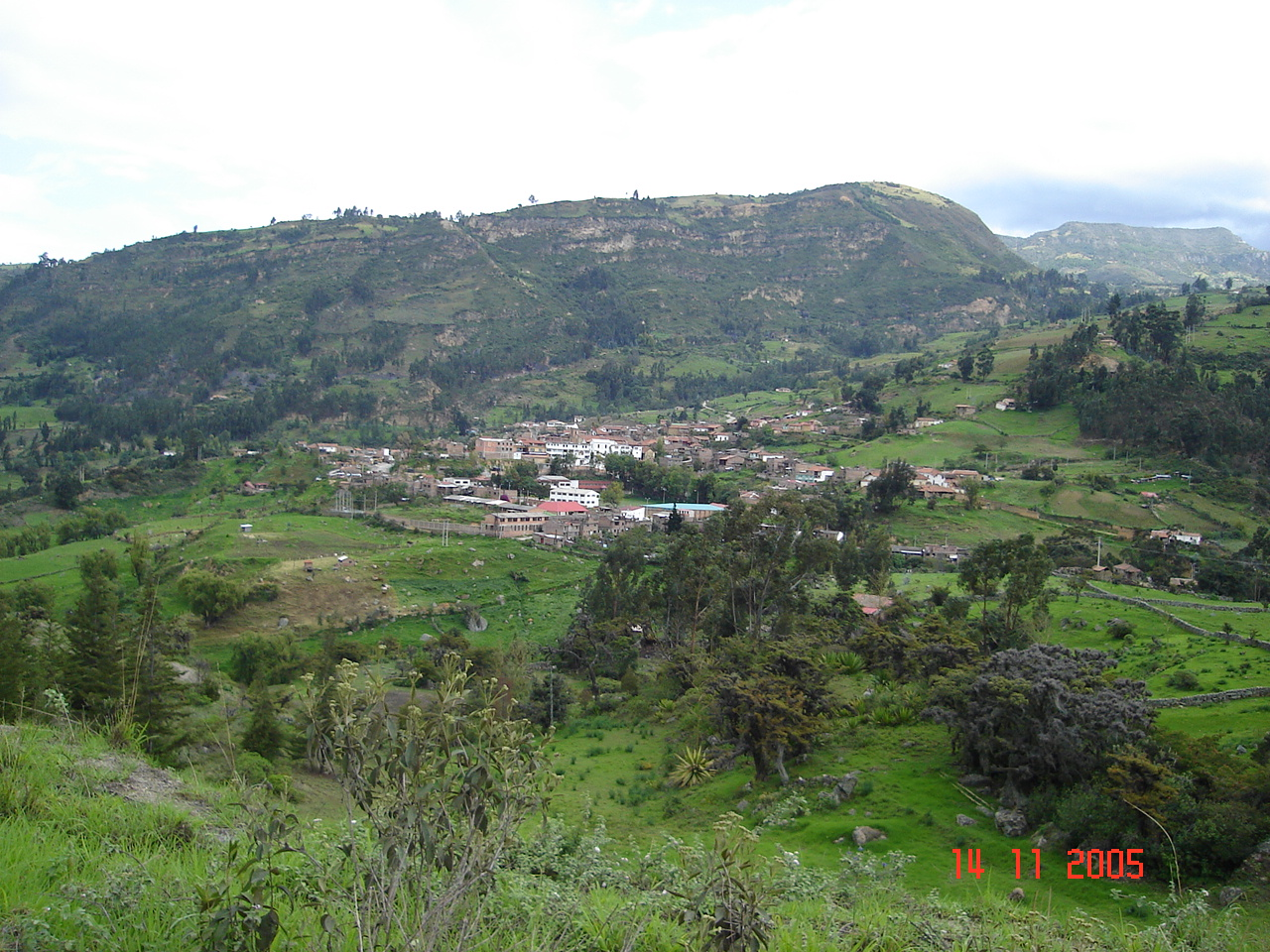
View of Tasco

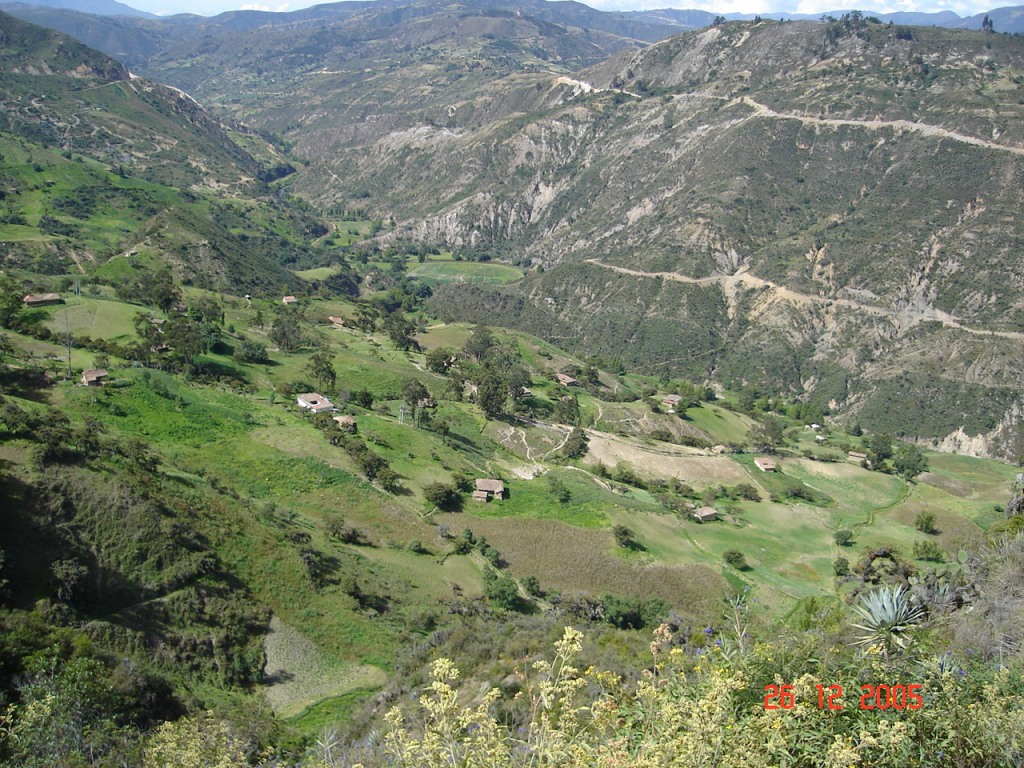
Chicamocha River
