= Sativanorte =

- Municipality and town
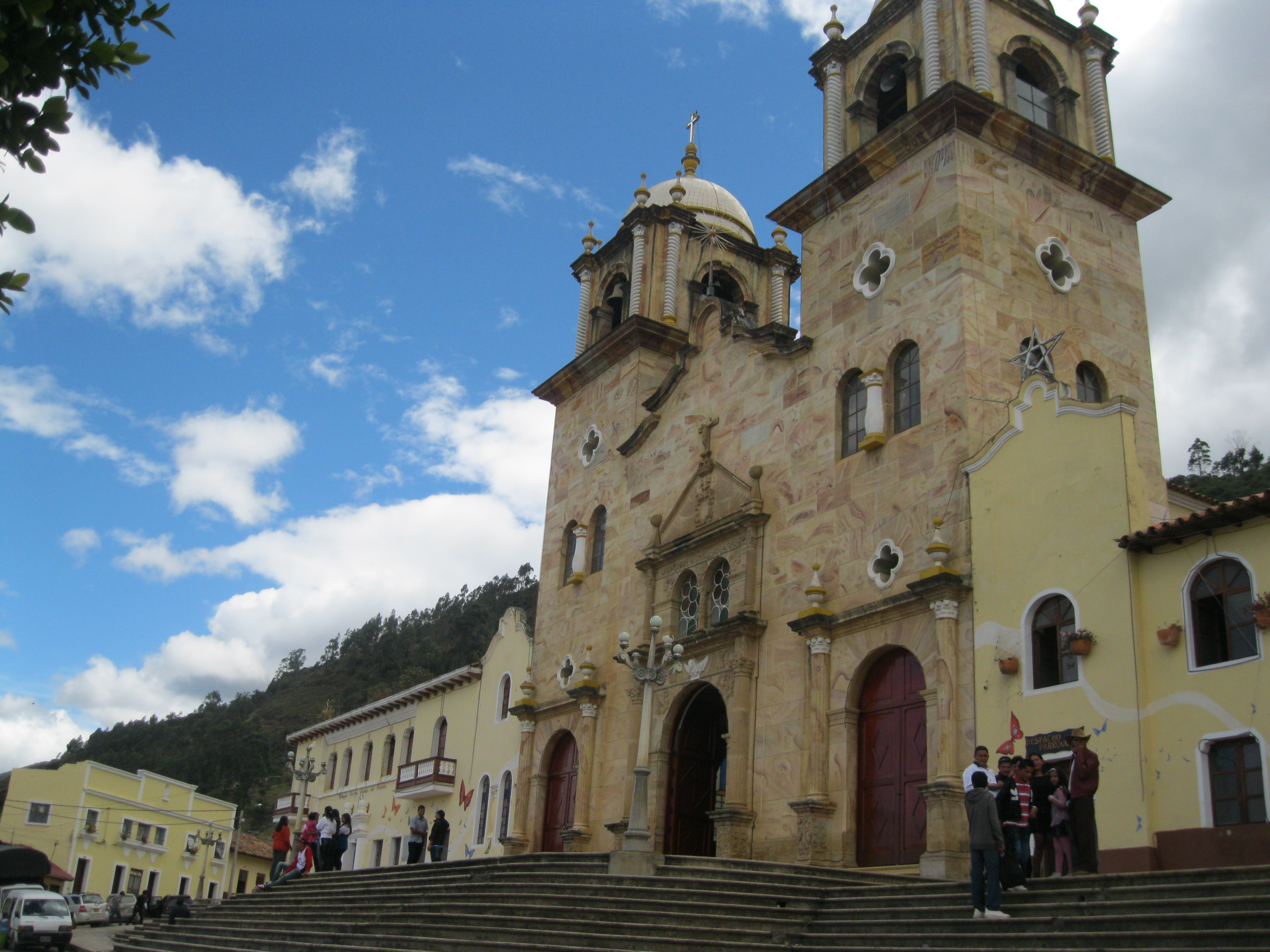
- Church of Saint Joseph

- Flag

- Location of the municipality and town of Sativanorte in the Boyacá Department of Colombia
- Coordinates: 6°7′53″N 72°42′27″W
- Country: Colombia
- Department: Boyacá Department
- Province: Northern Boyacá Province
- Founded: 15 March 1934

Government
  - Mayor: Jimeno García García (2020-2023)

Area
  - Municipality and town: 184 km^{2} (71 sq mi)
  - Urban: 1 km^{2} (0.39 sq mi)
- Elevation: 2,600 m (8,500 ft)

Population (2015)
  - Municipality and town: 2,339
  - Density: 12.7/km^{2} (32.9/sq mi)
  - Urban: 528
- Time zone: UTC-5 (Colombia Standard Time)
- Website: Official website

Sativanorte is a town and municipality in the Colombian Department of Boyacá, part of the subregion of the Northern Boyacá Province. Sativanorte borders Susacón in the north, in the south Sativasur and Tutazá, in the west Onzaga of the department of Santander and in the east Jericó and Socotá.

== Etymology ==
The names for Sativanorte and Sativasur are derived from the cacique Sátiva, which in the Chibcha language of the Muisca means: "Captain of the Sun".

== History ==
Sativanorte and Sativasur were called Sátiva in the times before the Spanish conquest of the Muisca on the central highlands (Altiplano Cundiboyacense) of Colombia. Sátiva was inhabited during the Herrera Period and later, as part of the Muisca Confederation, ruled by the cacique Tundama, from the city with the same name, today known as Duitama. The Spanish conquistadores who conquered the area submitting the Muisca in 1540 were Gonzalo Suárez Rendón and Hernán Pérez de Quesada. Sátiva was founded in 1633 and modern Sativanorte was founded on March 15, 1934.

== Geology ==
Rocks outcropping around Sativanorte are metamorphic quartzites, phyllites and schists of Paleozoic age. Locally also sandstones and siltstones are present. The southern boundary of the territory is formed by the Chicamocha fault, the western boundary forms the Chaguaca fault. Through the municipality runs the Soapága fault with a northeastern strike.

== Economy ==
Main economical activities in Sativanorte are agriculture, livestock farming and ecotourism. To the north the Chicamocha Canyon is located and to the east the Sierra Nevada del Cocuy.

== Climate ==
Climate data for Sativanorte, elevation 2,594 m (8,510 ft), (1981–2010)
Month	Jan	Feb	Mar	Apr	May	Jun	Jul	Aug	Sep	Oct	Nov	Dec	Year
Mean daily maximum °C (°F)	21.2 (70.2)	21.5 (70.7)	21.4 (70.5)	20.7 (69.3)	20.2 (68.4)	19.8 (67.6)	19.6 (67.3)	19.7 (67.5)	20.1 (68.2)	20.0 (68.0)	20.0 (68.0)	20.5 (68.9)	20.4 (68.7)
Daily mean °C (°F)	15.5 (59.9)	15.5 (59.9)	15.5 (59.9)	15.5 (59.9)	15.4 (59.7)	15.2 (59.4)	15.0 (59.0)	15.1 (59.2)	15.2 (59.4)	15.1 (59.2)	15.1 (59.2)	15.3 (59.5)	15.3 (59.5)
Mean daily minimum °C (°F)	9.4 (48.9)	9.6 (49.3)	10.0 (50.0)	10.7 (51.3)	10.7 (51.3)	10.3 (50.5)	10.0 (50.0)	10.0 (50.0)	9.9 (49.8)	10.1 (50.2)	10.2 (50.4)	9.7 (49.5)	10.0 (50.0)
Average precipitation mm (inches)	38.9 (1.53)	54.3 (2.14)	91.3 (3.59)	153.5 (6.04)	122.8 (4.83)	46.8 (1.84)	44.8 (1.76)	49.7 (1.96)	81.6 (3.21)	156.4 (6.16)	148.9 (5.86)	61.3 (2.41)	1,050.2 (41.35)
Average precipitation days (≥ 1.0 mm)	7	9	13	18	18	13	14	14	14	18	16	10	163
Average relative humidity (%)	64	65	67	70	70	68	66	66	67	69	70	67	68
Source: Instituto de Hidrologia Meteorologia y Estudios Ambientales

== Gallery ==
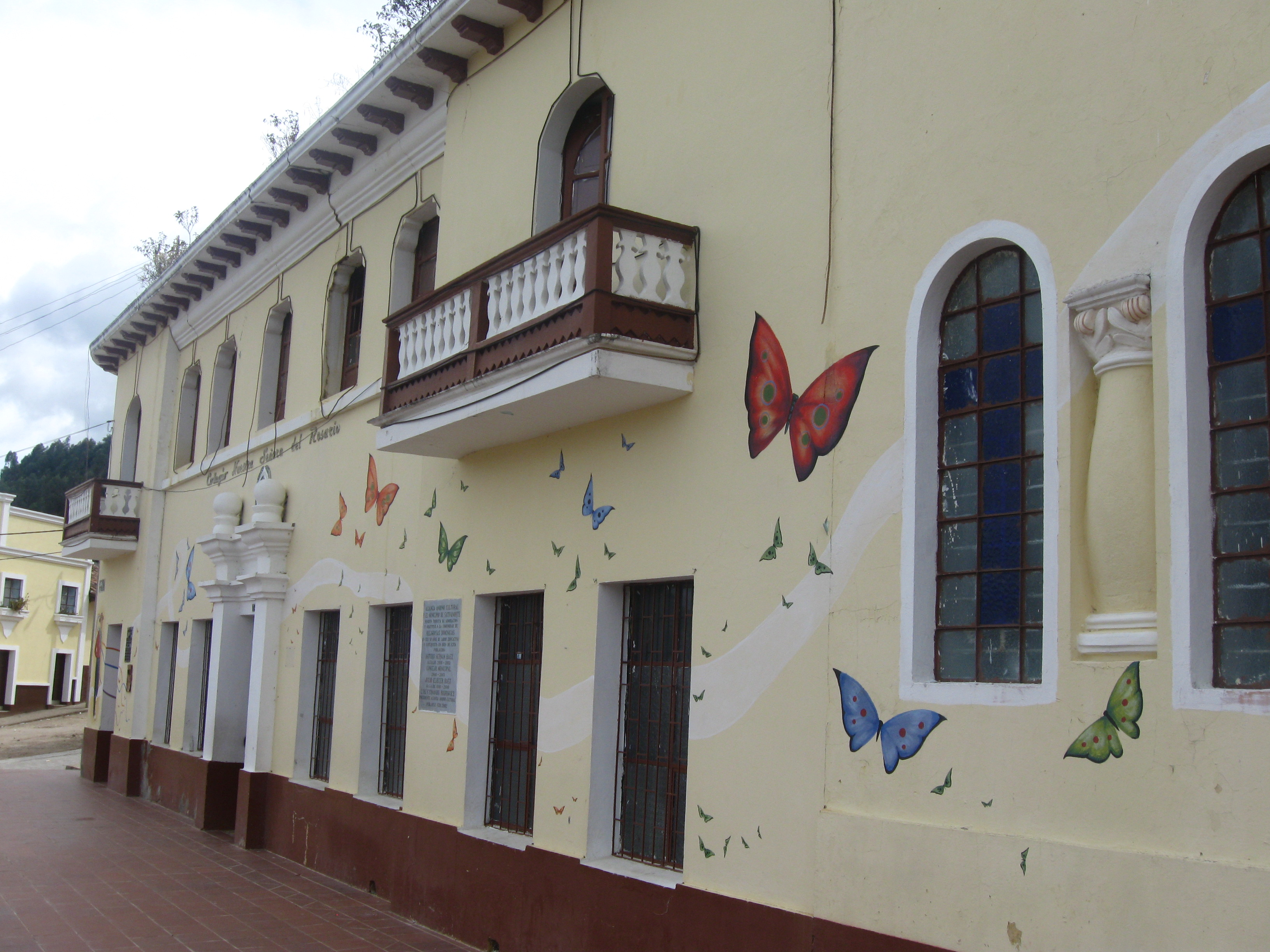
School

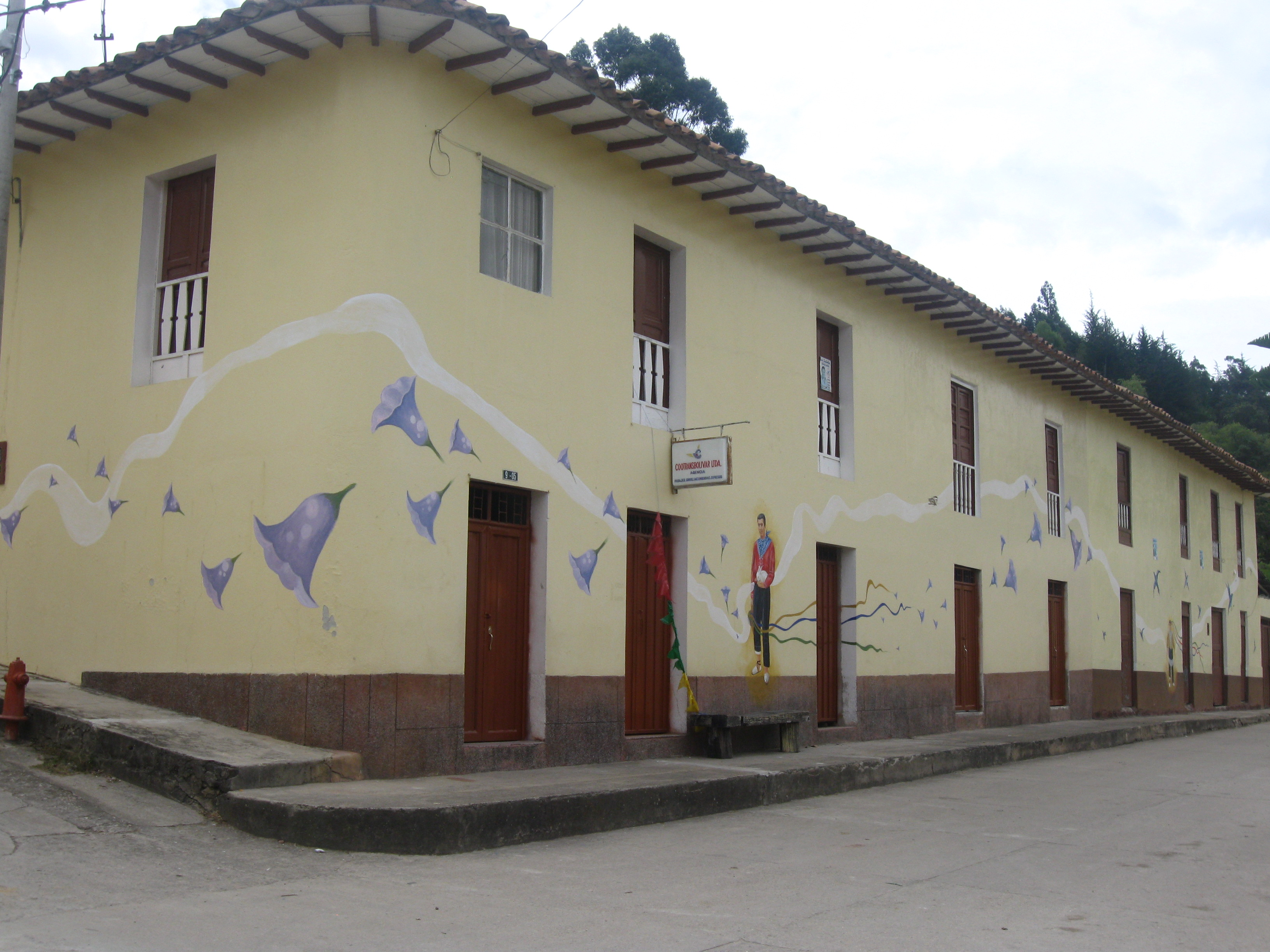
Street corner

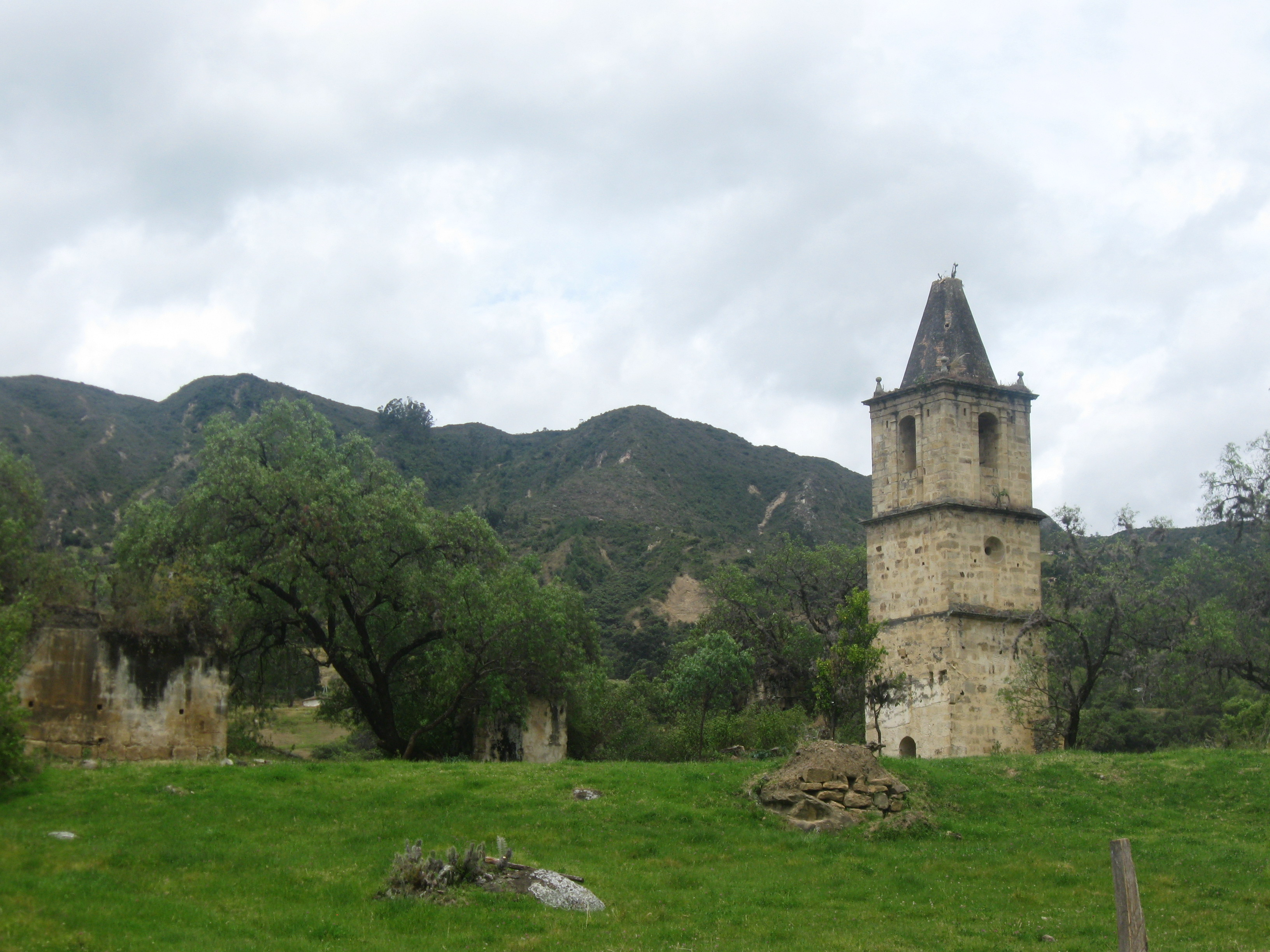
Church ruins

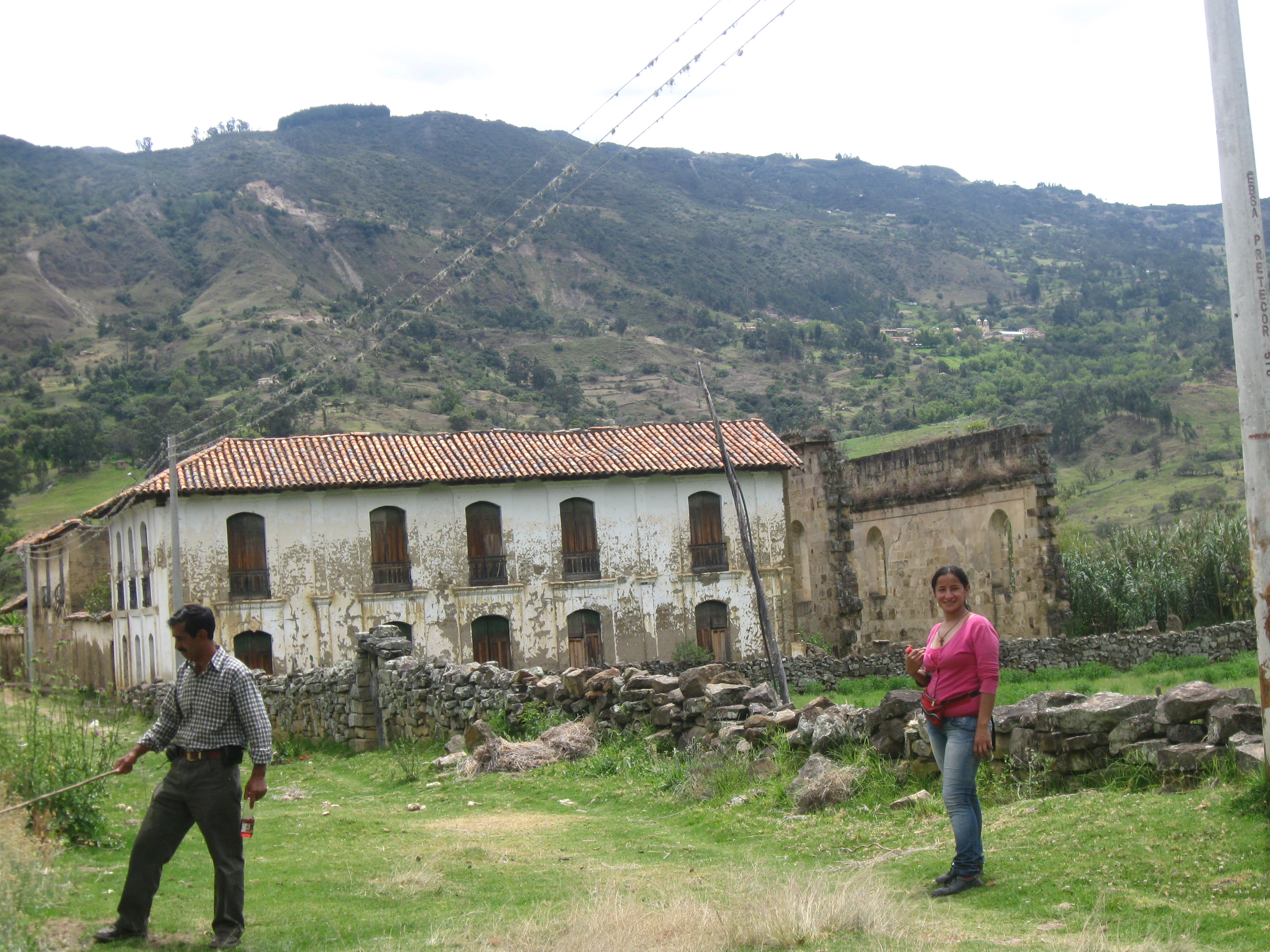
Church ruins

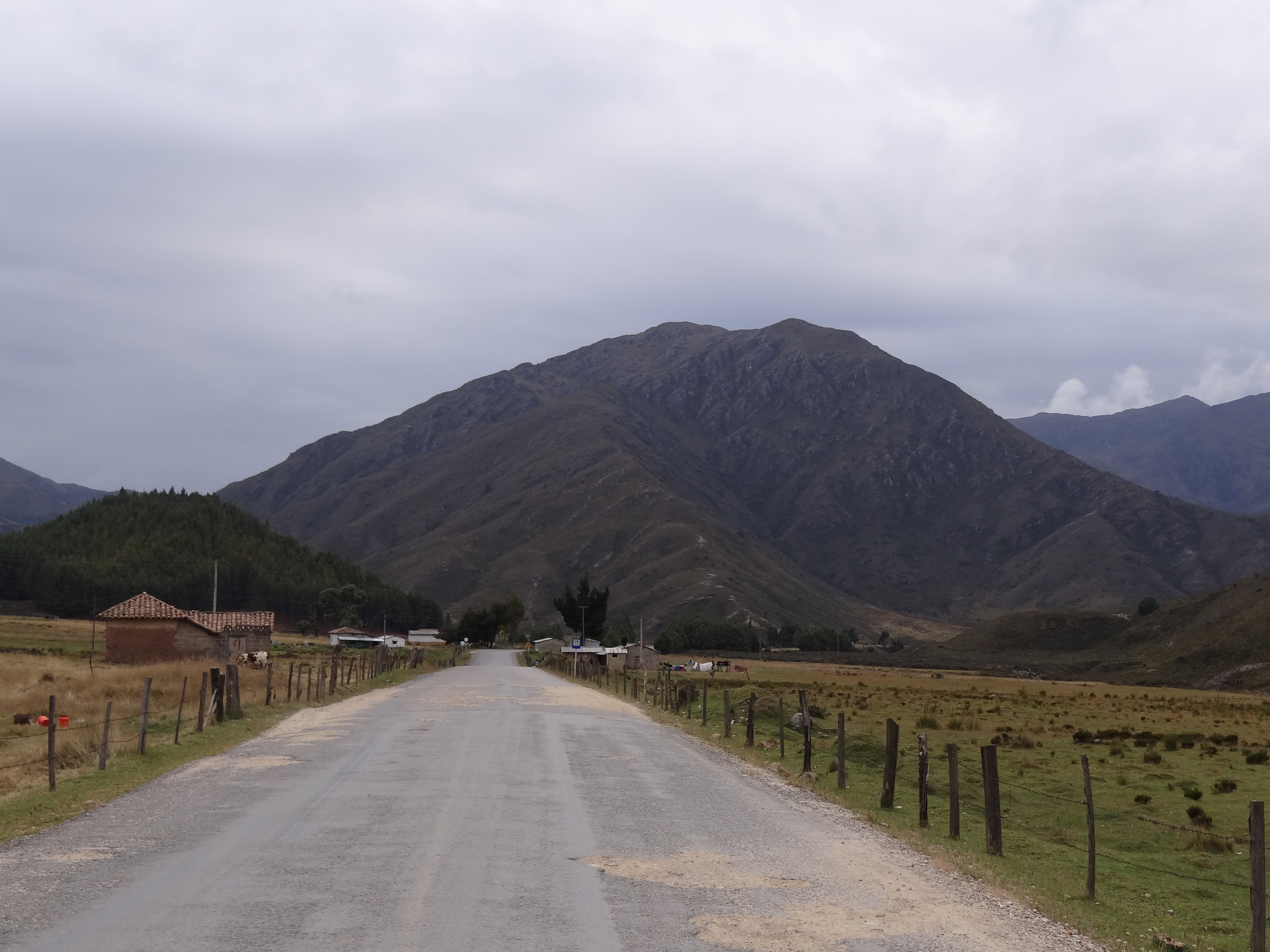
Rural area around Sativanorte
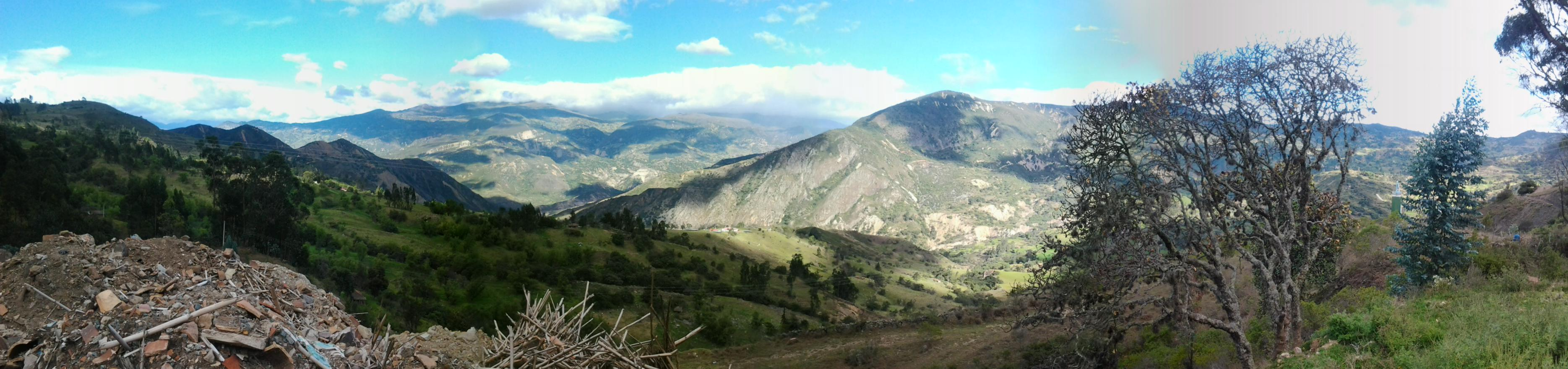
Panoramic view of Sativanorte
