= Pisba National Natural Park =

National park in Colombia

- Parque nacional natural Pisba
- IUCN category II (national park)
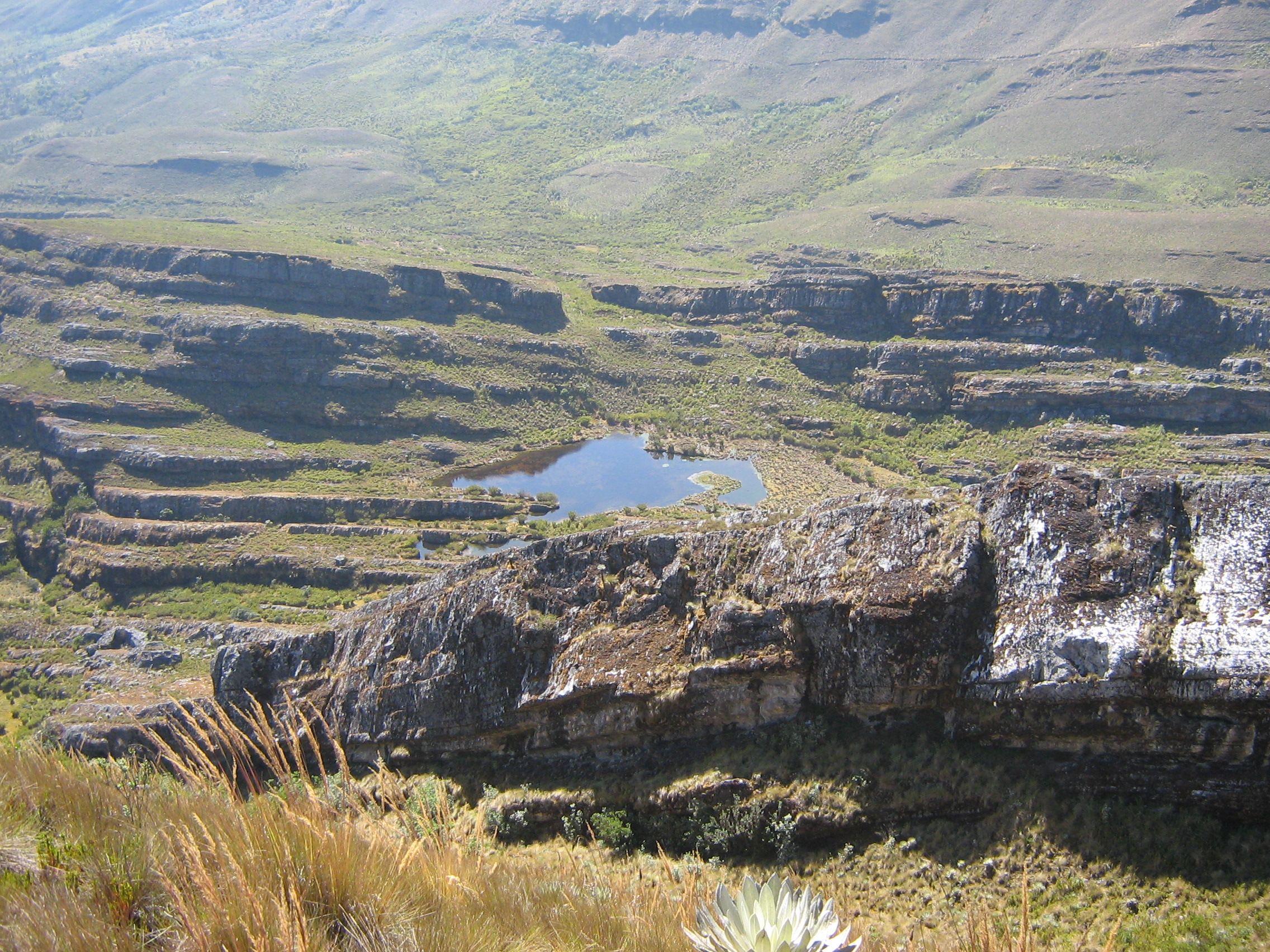

- Location within Colombia
- Location: Boyacá Department, Colombia
- Coordinates: 5°53′24.1″N 72°34′12.0″W
- Area: 35,145 ha (135.70 sq mi)
- Established: 1977
- Governing body: National System of Protected Areas (Colombia)
- Website: Website

Pisba National Natural Park (Spanish: Parque nacional natural Pisba) is a national park of Colombia located in the Cordillera Oriental of the Colombian Andes. It contains Andean forests, cloud forests, and is most well-known for its páramos. It is located inside Boyacá Department, near the municipalities of Pisba, Mongua, Tasco, Socha, and Socotá.

The legend of La Mancarita, a woman made of ice lurking in the fog to lure men into it, comes from the Pisba.

== History ==
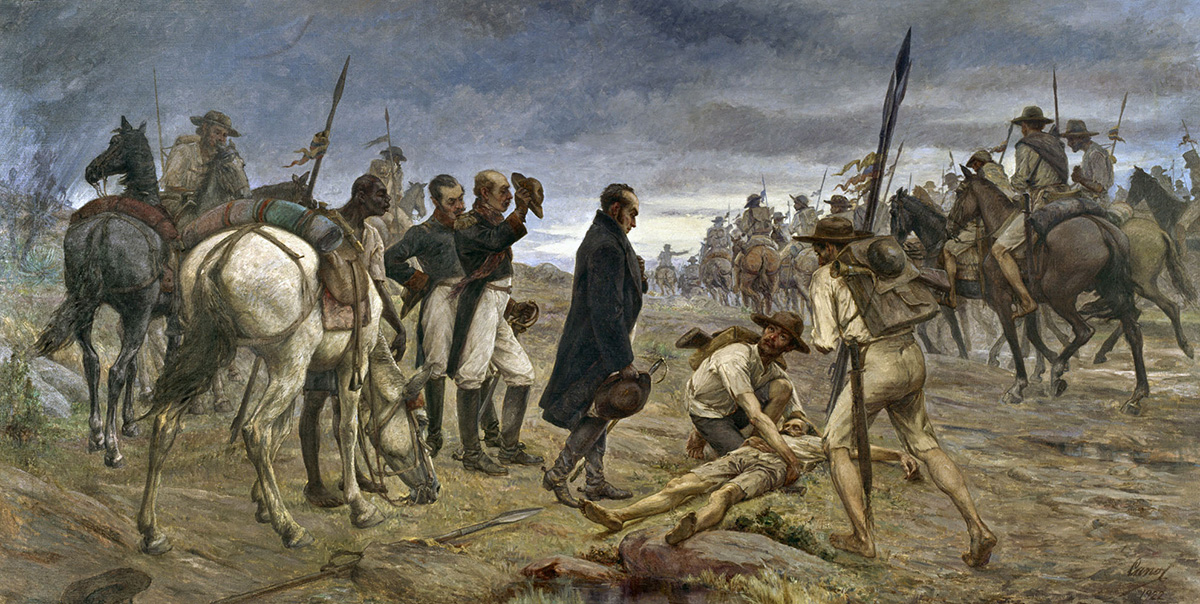
Francisco Antonio Cano Cardona's depiction of Simón Bolívar crossing the páramos of the Pisba

Before the Spanish arrival to the area, it was home to the Tunebo on the west side of the mountain and the Lache along the Chicamocha River in the east. The first Spanish contact came during Hernán Pérez de Quesada's expedition to find the Casa del Sol (City of the Sun).

In 1819, Simón Bolívar marched his army through the Pisba from Tame to Socha during the campaign to liberate New Granada. His army endured constant freezing rain. A significant amount of his force perished, with one quarter of the British Legions dying. Also endured was a major loss in horses, none of which survived, and guns. However, the route was entirely unguarded because of the anticipated difficulty, allowing Bolívar a quick advance to Bogotá.

The park itself was established in May 1977 and is administered by the National System of Protected Areas. The park is only part of the greater Pisba region, which in total has 6,794 residents in 4,112 houses. Inside the park, no development is allowed to take place, although in recent years, coal mining licenses have been issued for inside the park. These operations are opposed by Greenpeace, who protest the mining as illegal. Inside the park, there sometimes occurs light ranching, farming, and firewood collection.

== Biology ==
Animals in the park include the spectacled bear, puma, spotted cat, white-tailed deer, coati, rabbits, the gorgeted wood quail, Apolinar's wren, and ducks. Dwarf forests are present at certain altitudes.

Prominent tree species in the park include the encenillo, pouteria, lechero, horse chestnut, and the lombricero.

== Weather ==
East of the mountains, the rainy season is from May to July, and the dry season is from January to February. July and August are dry in the west. The average yearly temperature is 5 degrees Celsius at the highest altitude, and 16 degrees Celsius at the low point.

== Geography ==
The topology of the region was formed by a mix of tectonic activity and Pleistocene glacial activity. The park contains the headwaters of the Pauto River, Tocaria River, and Cravo Sur River, while the Chicomocha River drains along the western side of the park. The rivers which begin in the park provide the drinking water for 130,000 people. The highest elevation in the park is 3800 meters.
