= Boyacá Department =

Department of Colombia

Department of Boyacá Departamento de Boyacá
- Department
- The Sierra Nevada del Cocuy

- Flag Coat of arms
- Motto: Boyacá, Duty of Everyone (Spanish: Boyacá, Deber de todos)
- Anthem: "Himno de Boyacá"
- Location of Boyacá in Colombia

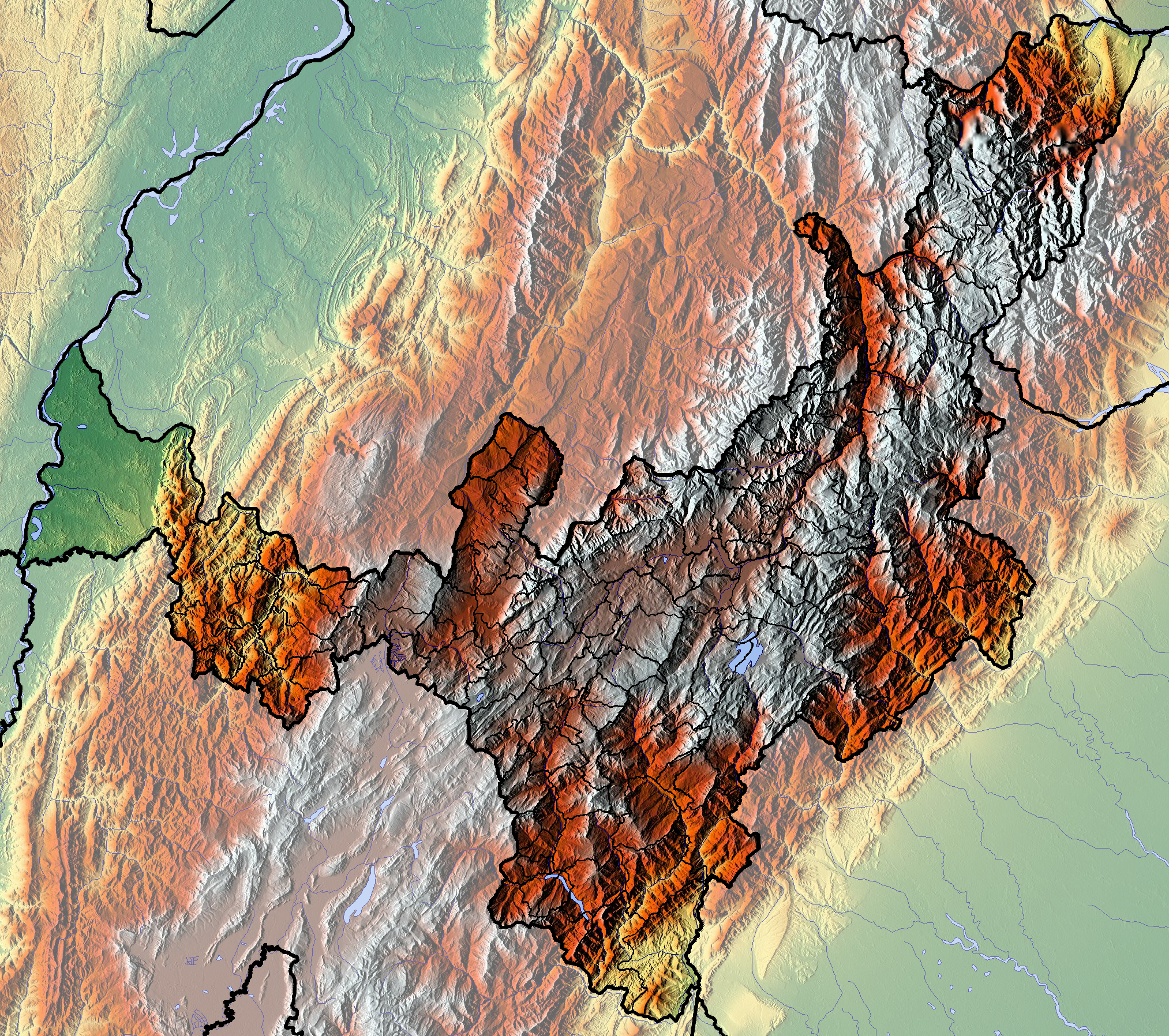
- Topography of the department
- Coordinates: 5°32′N 73°22′W
- Country: Colombia
- Region: Andean Region
- Department: 1824
- Province: 1539
- Capital: Tunja

Government
  - Governor: Carlos Andrés Amaya (2016-2019) (Liberal and Green Alliance)

Area
  - Total: 23,189 km^{2} (8,953 sq mi)
  - Rank: 20th

Population (2018)
  - Total: 1,217,376
  - Rank: 13th
  - Density: 52.498/km^{2} (135.97/sq mi)

GDP
  - Total: COP 38,858 billion (US$ 9.1 billion)
- Time zone: UTC-05
- ISO 3166 code: CO-BOY
- Provinces: 13
- Municipalities: 123
- HDI: 0.780 high · 12th of 33
- Website: Official website

Historical population
Year	Pop.	±%
1973	1,077,361	—
1985	1,209,739	+12.3%
1993	1,315,579	+8.7%
2005	1,255,311	−4.6%
2018	1,217,376	−3.0%

Boyacá (Spanish pronunciation: [boʝaˈka]) is one of the thirty-two departments of Colombia, and the remnant of Boyacá State, one of the original nine states of the "United States of Colombia".

Boyacá is centrally located within Colombia, almost entirely within the mountains of the Eastern Cordillera to the border with Venezuela, although the western end of the department extends to the Magdalena River at the town of Puerto Boyacá. Boyacá borders to the north with the Department of Santander, to the northeast with the Bolivarian Republic of Venezuela and Norte de Santander, to the east with the departments of Arauca and Casanare. To the south, Boyacá borders the department of Cundinamarca and to the west with the Department of Antioquia covering a total area of 23,189 square kilometres (8,953 sq mi). The capital of Boyacá is the city of Tunja.

Boyacá is known as "The Land of Freedom" because this region was the scene of a series of battles which led to Colombia's independence from Spain. The first one took place on 25 July 1819 in the Pantano de Vargas and the final and decisive battle known as the Battle of Boyacá was fought on 7 August 1819 at Puente de Boyacá.

Boyacá is home to three universities: the Universidad Pedagógica y Tecnológica de Colombia (UPTC), the Universidad de Boyacá (UNIBOYACA), and the Saint Thomas Aquinas University.

== Etymology ==
The word Boyacá derived from the Chibcha word "Bojacá" which means "Near the cacique", or "Region of the royal mantle".

== History ==
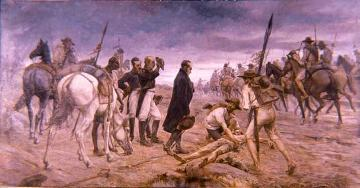
El Libertador Simón Bolívar crossing the Páramo de Pisba.

The territory of present-day Boyaca was during the Pre-Columbian time the domain of the Muisca indigenous peoples. The Muisca under the chiefdom of the zaque of Hunza lived mainly by agriculture and mining gold and emeralds.

The first European to discover the area was the Spaniard Gonzalo Jiménez de Quesada who conquered the northern Muisca living in the area led by last zaque Aquiminzaque and distributed the land in encomiendas and forced the indigenous people to work for him.

In 1539, Gonzalo Suárez Rendón, a Spanish conquistador, founded the city of Tunja and other sites where the indigenous people previously had their villages. Tunja became one of the main political and economic centers for the Spanish during the Viceroyalty of New Granada.

During the 19th century, Boyacá was battleground for numerous confrontations between the royalist and patriot armies led by Simón Bolívar during the Spanish colonies' war of independence from Spain. Two of the most decisive battles were the Battle of Boyacá and the Battle of Vargas Swamp (1819) won by the patriot forces against the royalists. In 1824 Gran Colombia created the Boyacá Department (Gran Colombia).

After the creation of the Granadine Confederation by 1858 the territory of now Boyaca became the Sovereign State of Boyacá. It was later rearranged in territory and administration and renamed as "Department of Boyaca" after a series of civil wars like the Colombian Civil War (1860–1862) and the Thousand Days War that struggled over a centralist or federalist system and political instability that changed to many constitutions (such as the Constitution of 1886), Boyaca finally acquired its current definition as territory.

== Geography ==
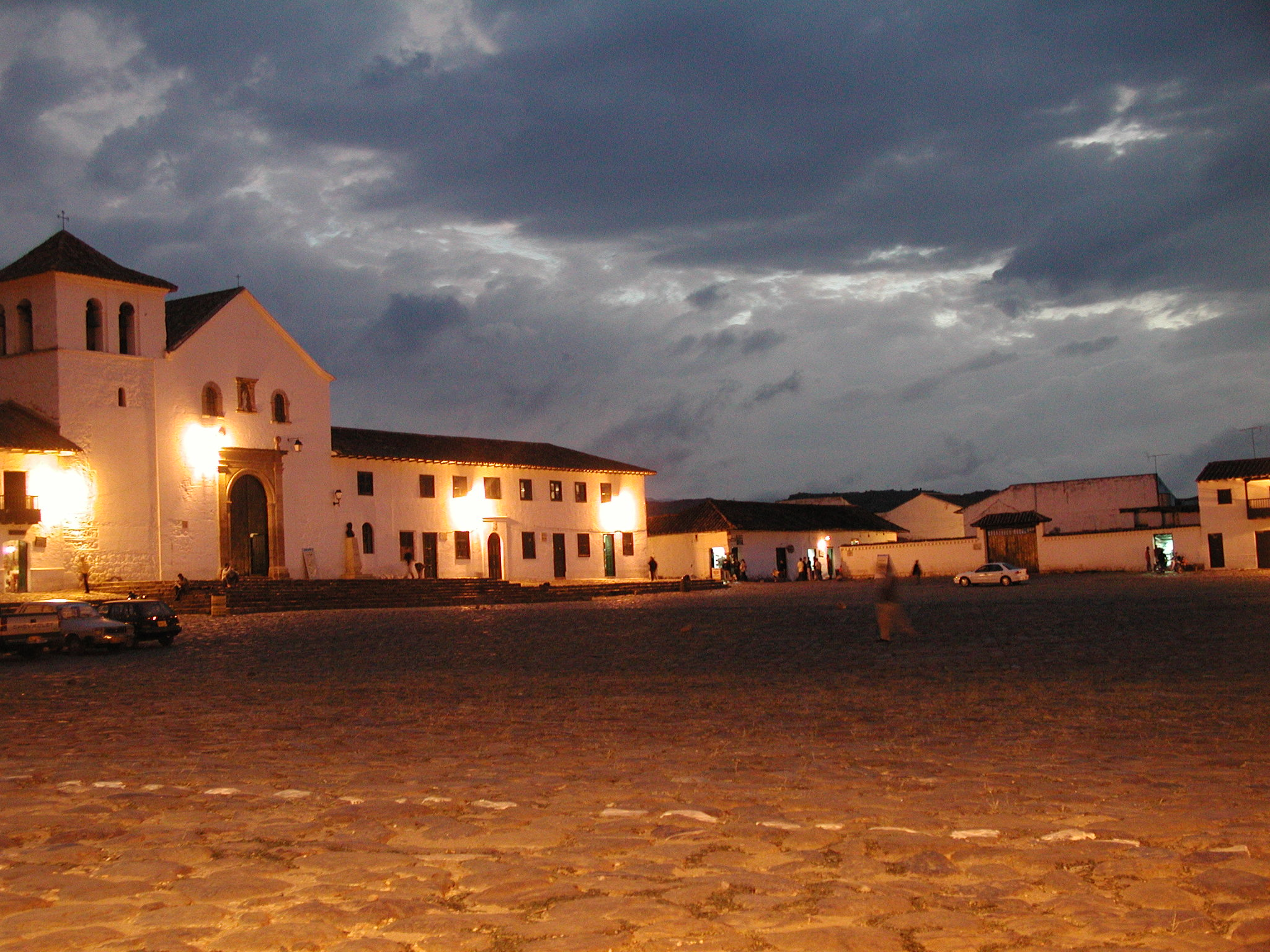
Villa de Leyva

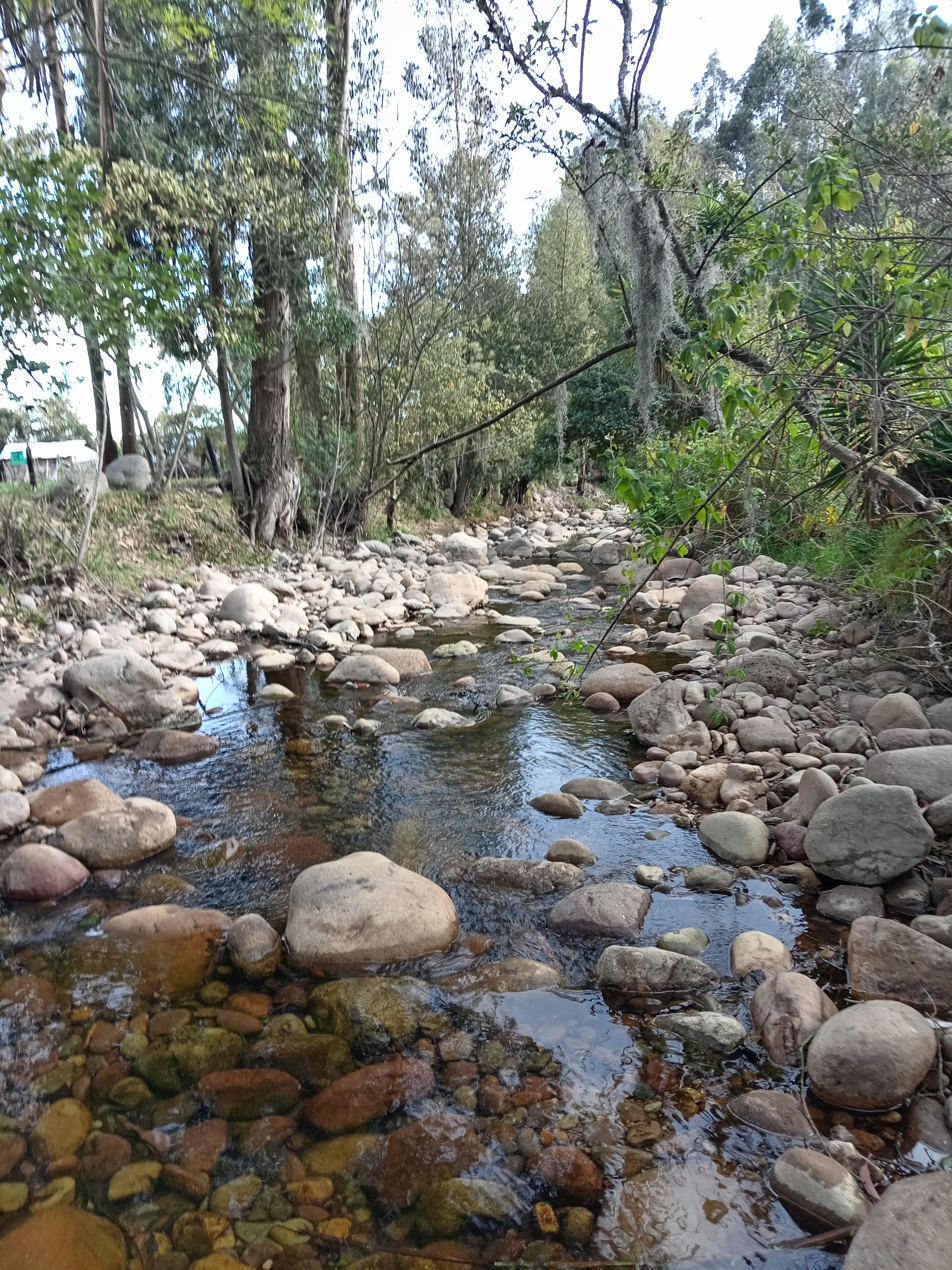
Río surba en la vereda la trinidad Duitama

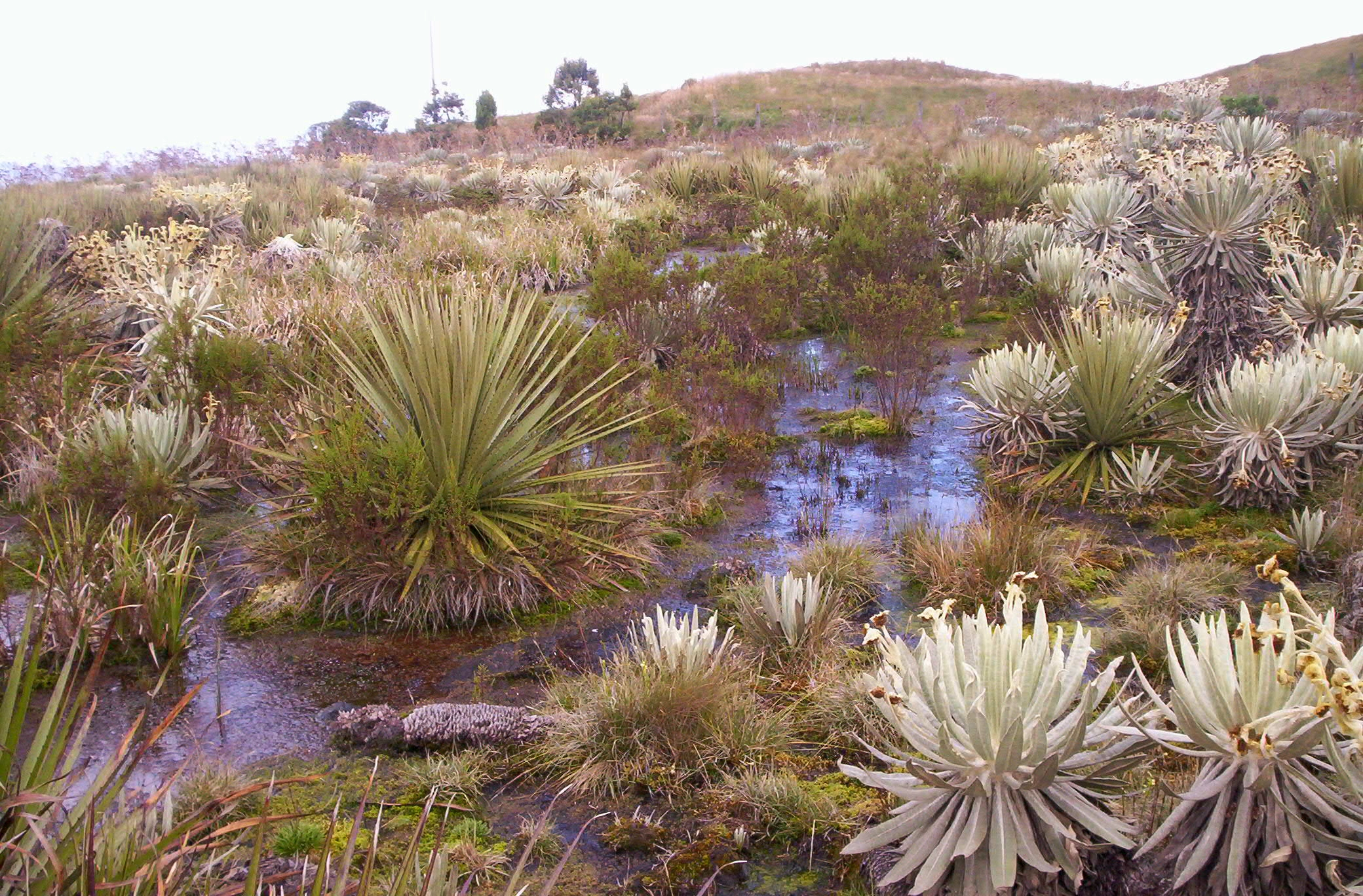
Páramo of Rabanal, Boyacá

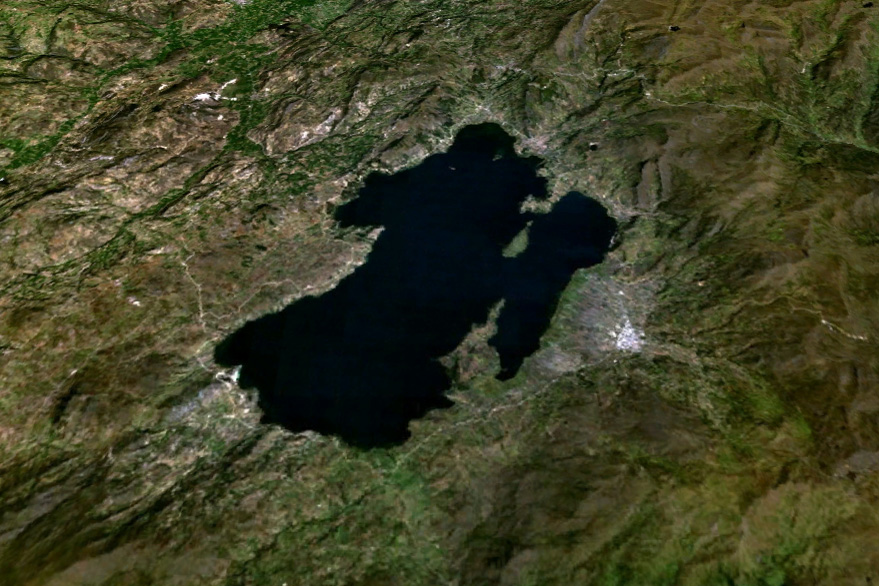
Satellite view of Lake Tota. Aquitania is the town in the east side of the lake

Boyacá is located in the Andean Region in central Colombia, over the Cordillera Oriental mountain range and covers a total area of 23,189 km^{2}. It borders other Colombian departments as follows: to the north Santander and Norte de Santander, to the east Arauca and Casanare, to the south Cundinamarca and a small part of Meta, and to the west Antioquia and Caldas. It has a territorial dispute with Norte de Santander and Cundinamarca.

The department of Boyacá covers a small portion of the Middle Magdalena valley of the Magdalena River to the west, the Cordillera Oriental mountain range with altitudes of 5,380 m above sea level (Sierra Nevada del Cocuy with 25 snow peaks), flat highland plateaux, and another small portion of territory by the eastern Llanos plains. Among its most prominent geographical features are the Range of the Zorro, Serrania de las Quinchas and the Andean plateaus of Rusia, Guantivá, Pisba, Chontales and Rechiniga.

The Altiplano Cundiboyacense, shared with the department of Cundinamarca, is densely populated with numerous valleys. The southern part is the Bogotá savanna. Boyacá is subdivided into 123 municipalities.

Many rivers originate in Boyacá, the most important are the Chicamocha River and Arauca River and tributaries to other important rivers such as the Magdalena and Meta.

Boyacá also has numerous lakes which include Lake Tota, Lake Sochagota and Lake Fúquene, shared with the department of Cundinamarca, the artificial Chivor Reservoir and others.

== National parks ==
El Cocuy and Pisba National Parks are located in the northeast of Boyacá. Pisba National Park is shared with the department of Arauca. The flora and fauna sanctuary of Lake Iguaque is situated in the centre of the department. The most beautiful páramo in the world, Ocetá Páramo, is in northeast Boyacá.

=== Climate ===
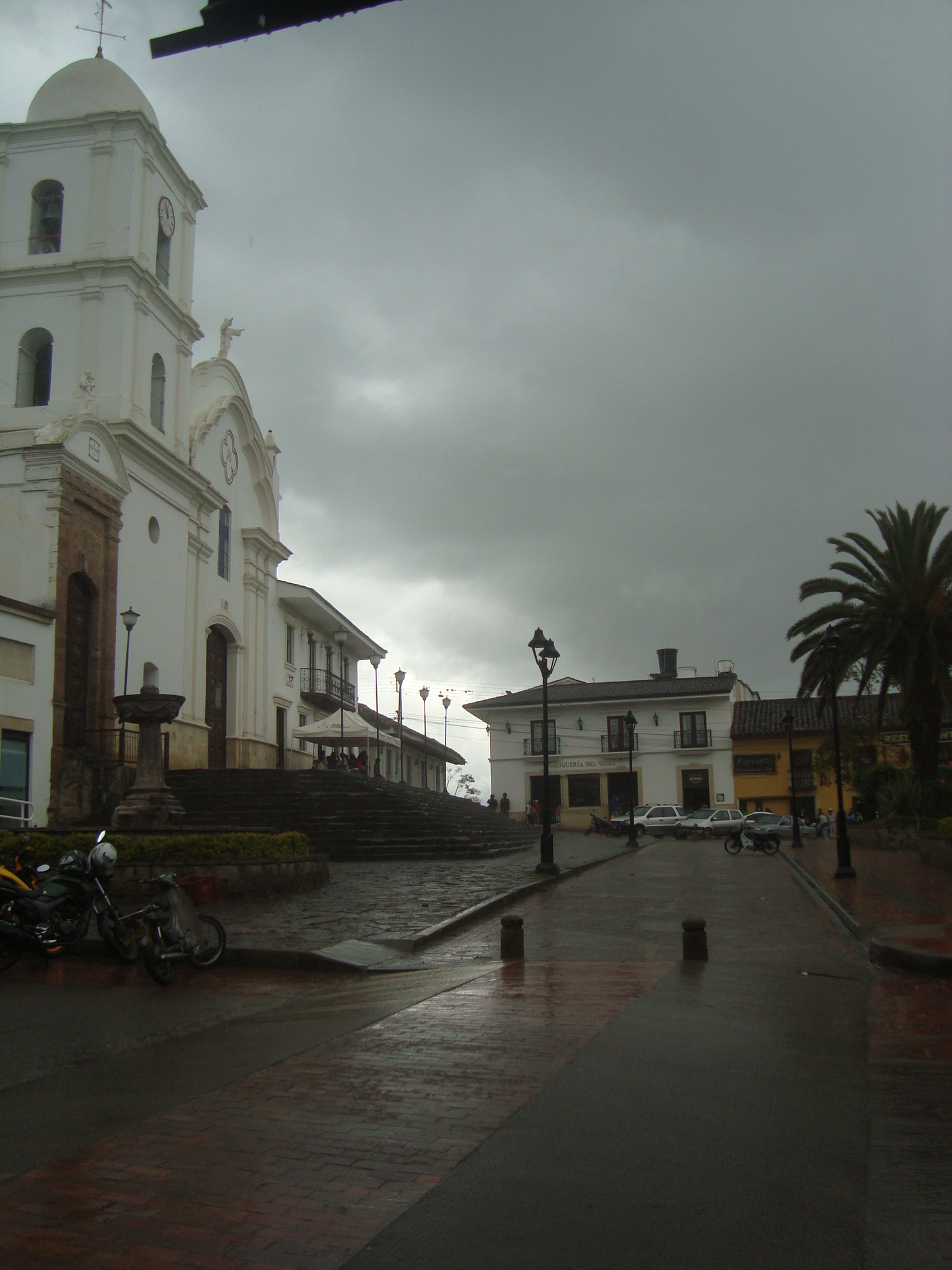
Guateque, in southeastern Boyacá during a rainy season

The central area of the highlands has two rainy seasons; the first between April and June, and a second between October and November with an average of 1,000 millimetres (39 in) of rainfall per year. The rest of the year is considered to be the dry seasons with intermittent rainfall.

== Provinces and municipalities ==
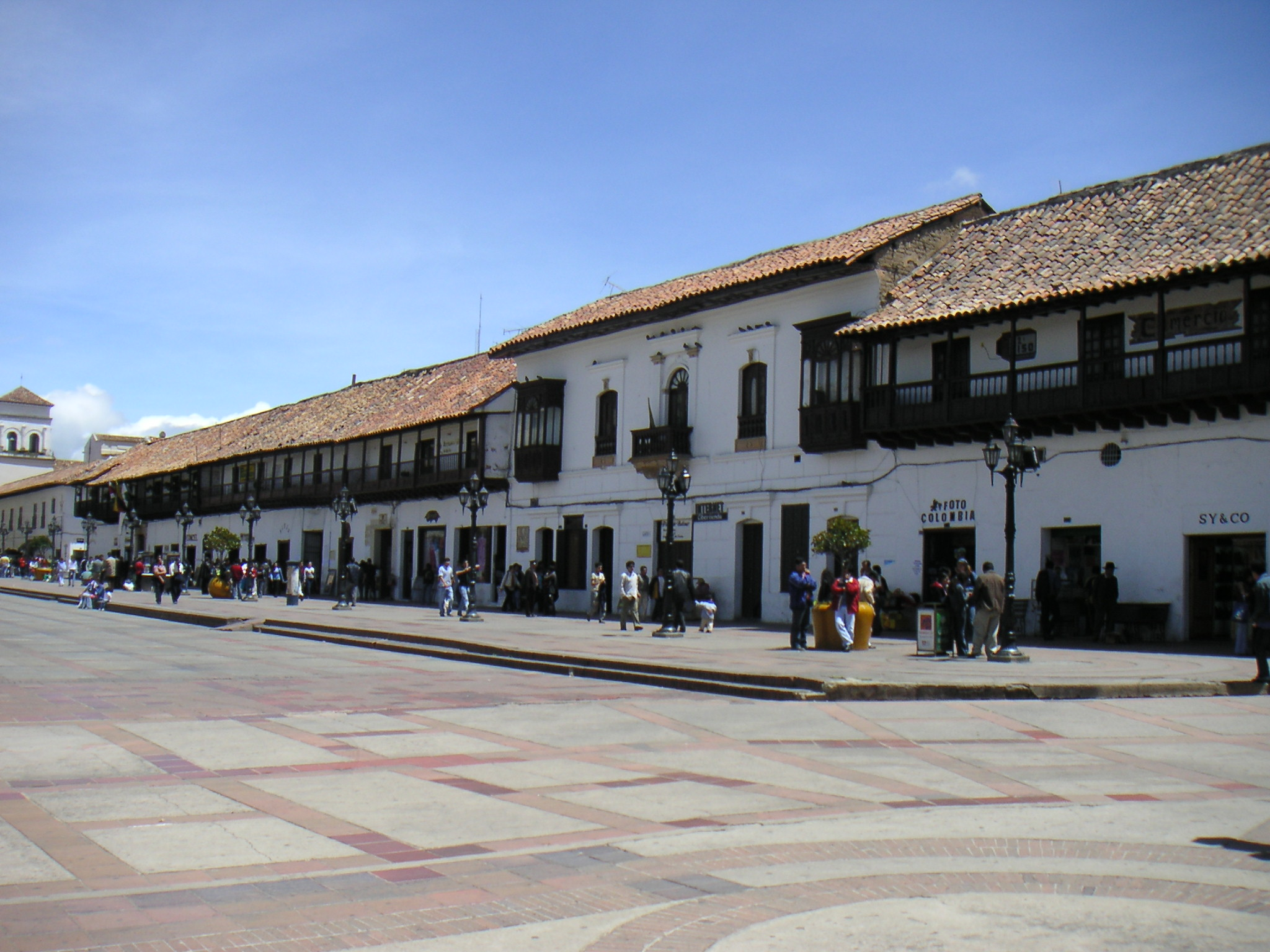
Tunja, capital of Boyacá

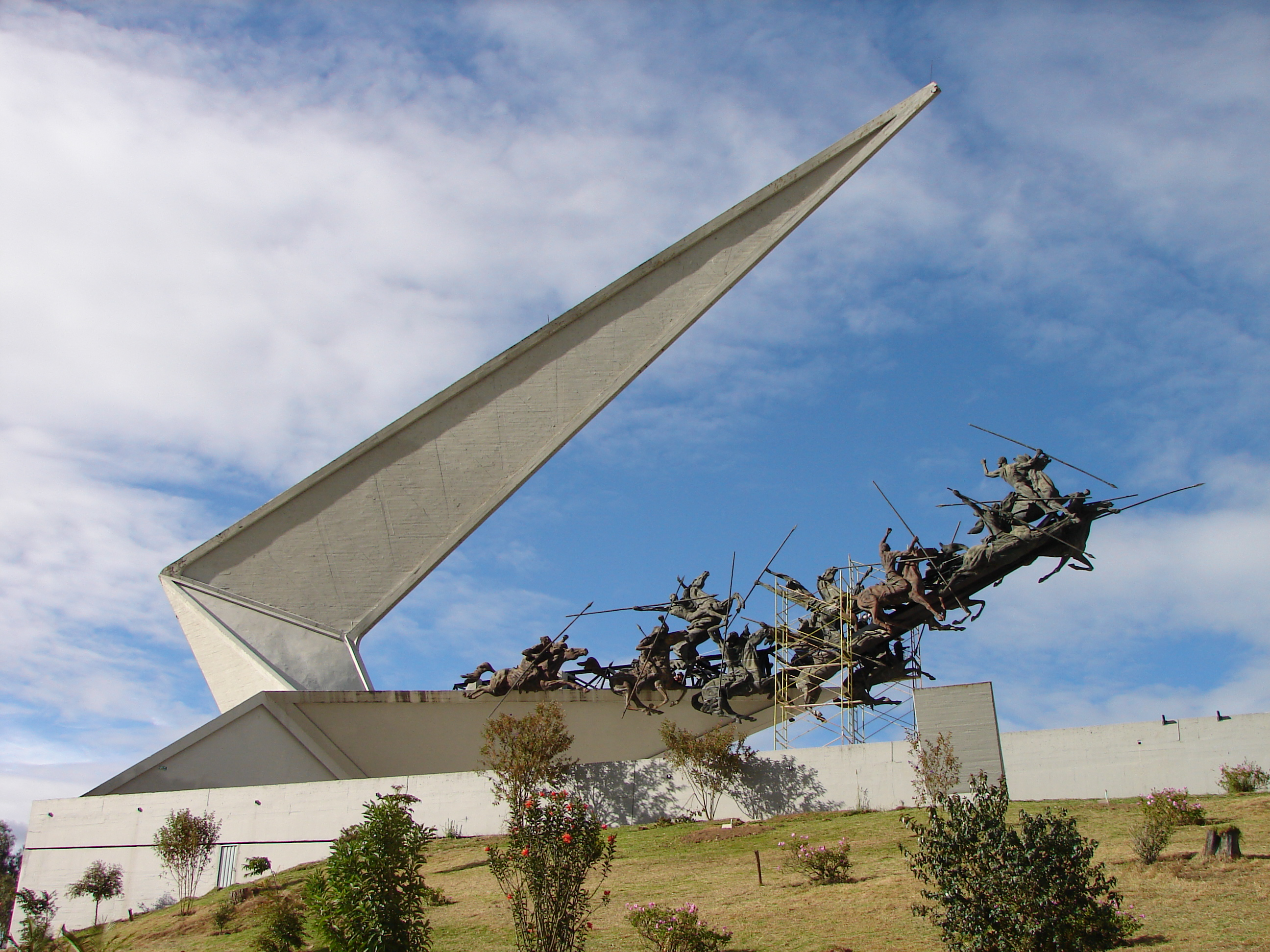
The Lancers Monument

There are 13 provinces and two special districts in the Boyacá Department, listed below with their 123 municipalities. The department also has 123 corregimientos, 185 police inspectorates and numerous towns and small villages spread throughout the territory.

Municipalities are also grouped into 45 notary circuits with 53 notaries public. One circuit main registry based in the capital of the department; Tunja and 13 other minor registries spread across the territory.

=== Central ===
1. Cómbita
2. Cucaita
3. Chíquiza
4. Chivatá
5. Motavita
6. Oicatá
7. Siachoque
8. Samacá
9. Sora
10. Soracá
11. Sotaquirá
12. Toca
13. Tunja
14. Tuta
15. Ventaquemada

=== Northern ===
1. Boavita
2. Covarachía
3. La Uvita
4. San Mateo
5. Sativanorte
6. Sativasur
7. Soatá
8. Susacón
9. Tipacoque

=== Western ===
1. Briceño
2. Buenavista
3. Caldas
4. Chiquinquirá
5. Coper
6. La Victoria
7. Maripí
8. Muzo
9. Otanche
10. Pauna
11. Quipama
12. Saboyá
13. San Miguel de Sema
14. San Pablo de Borbur
15. Tununguá

=== Eastern ===
1. Almeida
2. Chivor
3. Guateque
4. Guayatá
5. La Capilla
6. Somondoco
7. Sutatenza
8. Tenza

=== Gutiérrez ===
1. Chiscas
2. El Cocuy
3. El Espino
4. Guacamayas
5. Güicán
6. Panqueba

=== La Libertad ===
1. Labranzagrande
2. Pajarito
3. Paya
4. Pisba

=== Lengupá ===
1. Berbeo
2. Campohermoso
3. Miraflores
4. Páez
5. San Eduardo
6. Zetaquirá

=== Márquez ===
1. Boyacá
2. Ciénega
3. Jenesano
4. Nuevo Colón
5. Ramiriquí
6. Rondón
7. Tibaná
8. Turmequé
9. Úmbita
10. Viracachá

=== Neira ===
1. Chinavita
2. Garagoa
3. Macanal
4. Pachavita
5. San Luis de Gaceno
6. Santa María

=== Ricaurte ===
1. Arcabuco
2. Chitaraque
3. Gachantivá
4. Moniquirá
5. Ráquira
6. Sáchica
7. San José de Pare
8. Santa Sofía
9. Santana
10. Sutamarchán
11. Tinjacá
12. Togüí
13. Villa de Leyva

=== Sugamuxi ===
1. Aquitania
2. Cuítiva
3. Firavitoba
4. Gámeza
5. Iza
6. Mongua
7. Monguí
8. Nobsa
9. Pesca
10. Sogamoso
11. Tibasosa
12. Tópaga
13. Tota

=== Tundama ===
1. Belén
2. Busbanzá
3. Cerinza
4. Corrales
5. Duitama
6. Floresta
7. Paipa
8. Santa Rosa de Viterbo
9. Tutazá

=== Valderrama ===
1. Betéitiva
2. Chita
3. Jericó
4. Paz de Río
5. Socotá
6. Socha
7. Tasco

=== Frontier District ===
1. Cubará

=== Special Handling Zone ===
1. Puerto Boyacá

== See also ==
- Postage stamps of Boyacá
