= Productos Ramo =

Colombian company

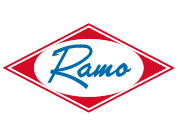
- Company type: Private
- Industry: Food processing, Dairy
- Founded: Bogotá, Colombia (1950)
- Founder: Rafael Molano Olarte
- Headquarters: Bogotá, Colombia
- Area served: Colombia
- Key people: Santiago Molano
- Products: Pastry, Chips, Desserts,
- Number of employees: 3,300
- Website: ramo.com

Productos Ramo SA is a popular Colombian snackfood company, one of the few independent national brands that offer serious competition to multinational brands like Frito Lay and Grupo Bimbo. Ramo snacks, sold in corner stores and snack stands around the country, are something of an institution in Colombia, the most well known of them being "Gala" packaged pastries, "Chocoramo," a square of cake coated in chocolate created by pastry chef Olimpo López, and "Tostacos" and "Maizitos" (Frito-like fried corn chips).

The company was founded in 1950 by Rafael Molano, from whom it takes its name. Ramo was the first brand to offer prepared and packaged cakes in Colombia. The logo and packaging of its products have changed little since the 1960s. It has several factories throughout the country and produces most of its own ingredients, including flour and eggs, in-house. Young men delivering Ramo products to neighborhood stores by freight tricycle are a common sight in larger Colombian cities.

== External References ==
- Rubio, Claudia (2008): "Productos Ramo S.A., una receta familiar que Rafael Molano Olarte convirtió en imperio " (Spanish), El Tiempo.
- Chocoramo (Spanish), Popular de Lujo.
- Sitio oficial de Productos Ramo
