= Chita, Boyacá =

Coordinates: 6°10′N 72°25′W

Chita
- Municipality and town
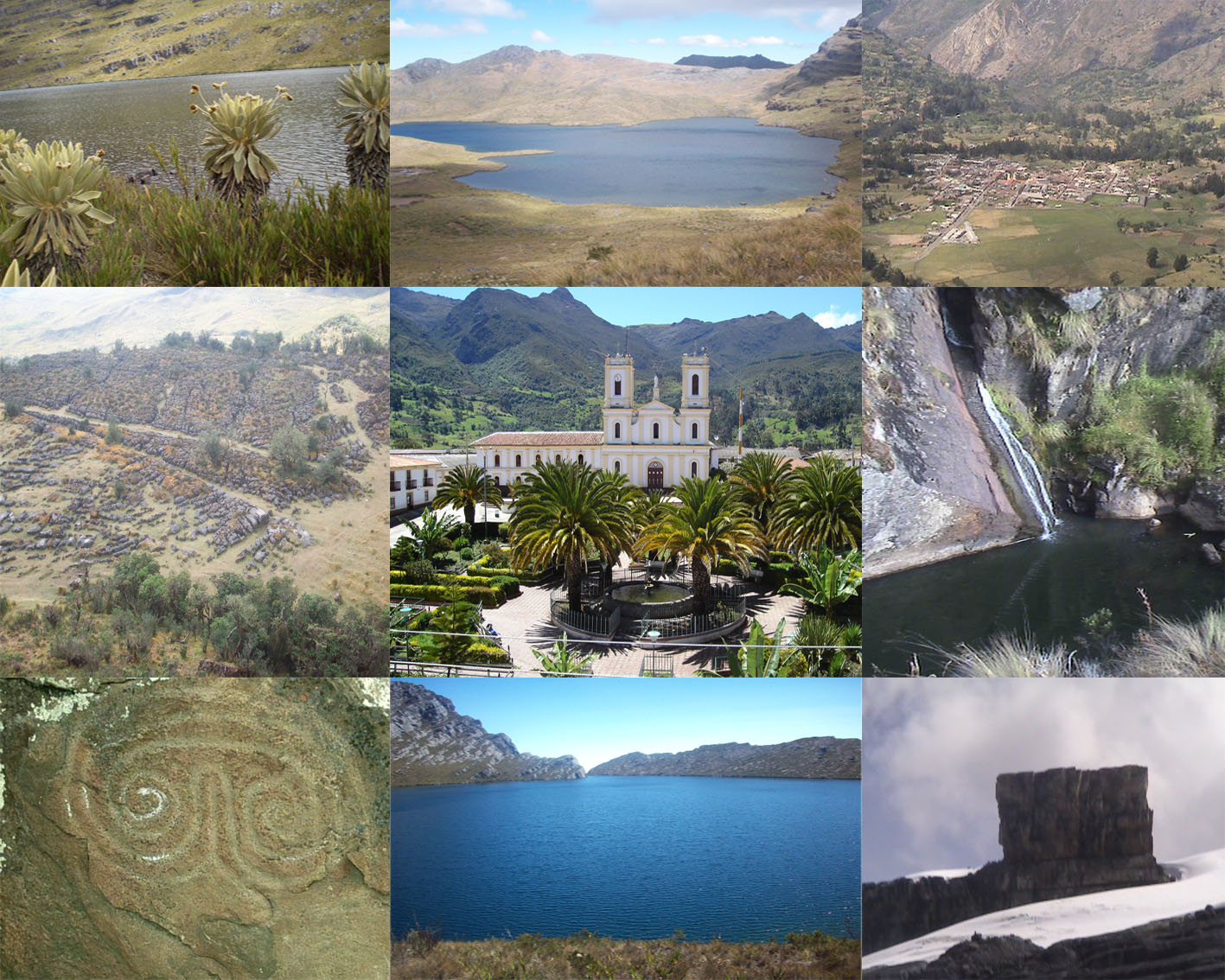

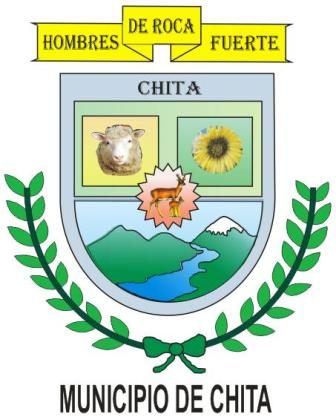
- Flag Coat of arms

- Location of the municipality and town of Chita in the Boyacá Department of Colombia.
- Country: Colombia
- Department: Boyacá Department
- Province: Valderrama Province

Government
  - Mayor: José Miguel Velandia Alarcón (2020-2023)
- Time zone: UTC-5 (Colombia Standard Time)

Chita is a town and municipality in the Colombian Department of Boyacá, part of the Valderrama Province a subregion of Boyaca in Colombia.

== Climate ==
Chita has a subtropical highland climate (Köppen: Cfb) with frequent rain and cool mild temperatures.

Climate data for Chita, elevation 2,888 m (9,475 ft), (1981–2010)
Month	Jan	Feb	Mar	Apr	May	Jun	Jul	Aug	Sep	Oct	Nov	Dec	Year
Mean daily maximum °C (°F)	18.4 (65.1)	18.6 (65.5)	18.7 (65.7)	17.8 (64.0)	17.1 (62.8)	16.1 (61.0)	15.4 (59.7)	15.7 (60.3)	16.4 (61.5)	17.0 (62.6)	17.2 (63.0)	17.9 (64.2)	17.2 (63.0)
Daily mean °C (°F)	11.6 (52.9)	12.0 (53.6)	12.4 (54.3)	12.5 (54.5)	12.2 (54.0)	11.6 (52.9)	11.1 (52.0)	11.3 (52.3)	11.5 (52.7)	11.8 (53.2)	11.9 (53.4)	11.7 (53.1)	11.8 (53.2)
Mean daily minimum °C (°F)	5.2 (41.4)	5.8 (42.4)	6.7 (44.1)	7.5 (45.5)	7.8 (46.0)	7.5 (45.5)	7.1 (44.8)	7.0 (44.6)	6.7 (44.1)	6.8 (44.2)	6.7 (44.1)	5.7 (42.3)	6.7 (44.1)
Average precipitation mm (inches)	15.0 (0.59)	25.1 (0.99)	48.5 (1.91)	109.3 (4.30)	119.6 (4.71)	114.6 (4.51)	160.0 (6.30)	123.8 (4.87)	93.0 (3.66)	107.5 (4.23)	97.8 (3.85)	34.6 (1.36)	1,048.7 (41.29)
Average precipitation days (≥ 1.0 mm)	5	7	11	17	20	23	25	24	21	20	16	9	196
Average relative humidity (%)	72	71	73	77	79	79	80	79	78	79	81	77	77
Mean monthly sunshine hours	244.9	200.4	179.8	126.0	114.7	105.0	105.4	114.7	126.0	136.4	153.0	217.0	1,823.3
Mean daily sunshine hours	7.9	7.1	5.8	4.2	3.7	3.5	3.4	3.7	4.2	4.4	5.1	7.0	5.0
Source: Instituto de Hidrologia Meteorologia y Estudios Ambientales
