= Jericó, Boyacá =

Coordinates: 6.14917°N 72.555°W

- Municipality and town
- Flag

- Location of the municipality and town of Jericó, Boyacá in the Boyacá Department of Colombia.
- Country: Colombia
- Department: Boyacá Department
- Province: Valderrama Province

Government
  - Mayor: Mayerly Báez Merchán (2020-2023)
- Elevation: 3,100 m (10,200 ft)
- Time zone: UTC-5 (Colombia Standard Time)

Jericó is a town and municipality in the Colombian Department of Boyacá, part of the Valderrama Province a subregion of Boyaca.

== Notable residents ==
- Olimpo López (1918–2015), pastry chef and creator of the Chocoramo (Productos Ramo)
