= Sativasur =

- Municipality and town
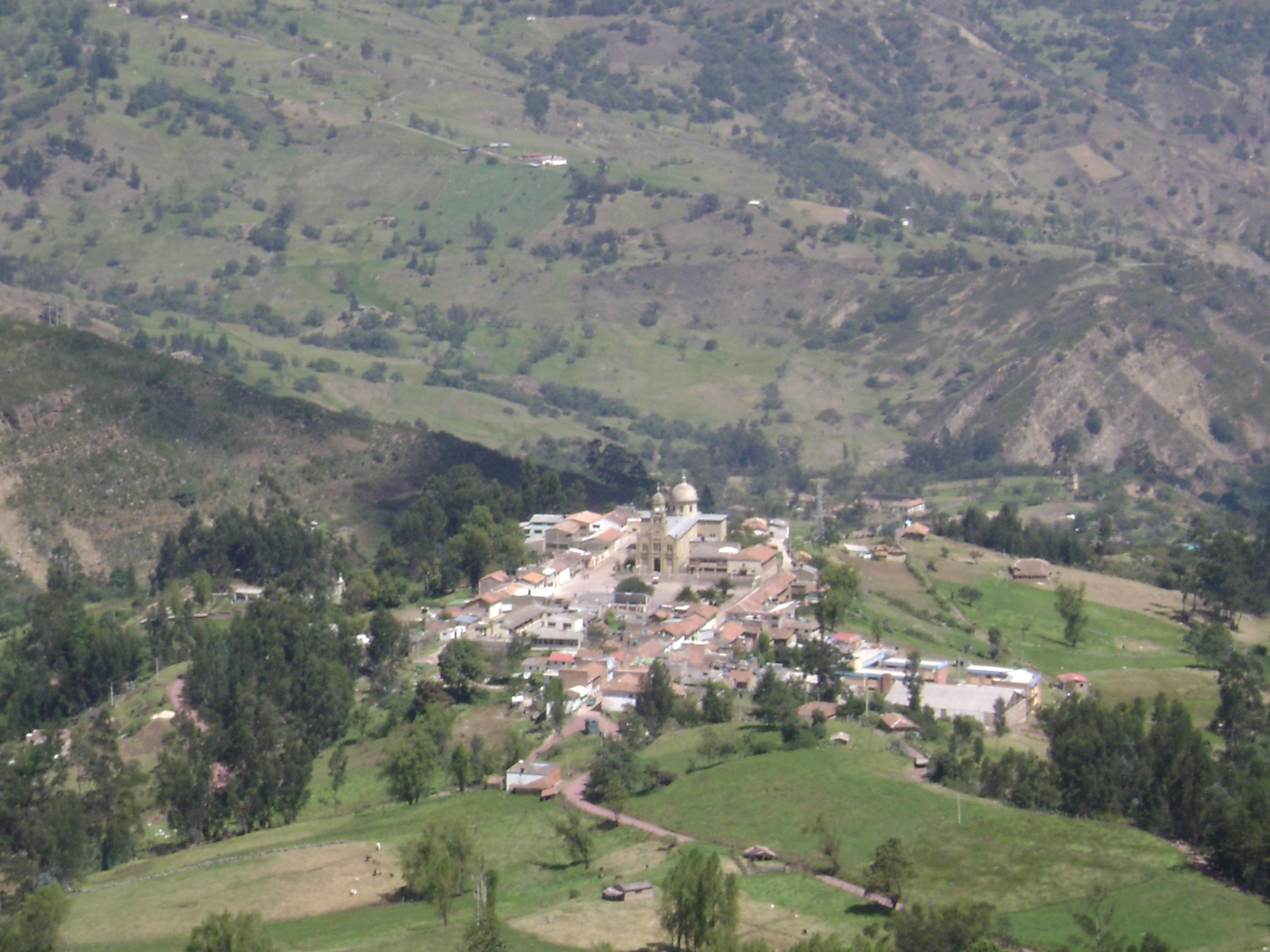
- View of Sativasur

- Flag

- Location of the municipality and town of Sativasur in the Boyacá Department of Colombia
- Coordinates: 6°05′N 72°44′W
- Country: Colombia
- Department: Boyacá Department
- Province: Northern Boyacá Province
- Founded: 30 January 1720

Government
  - Mayor: Edison Manuel Aparicio Arismendy (2020-2023)

Area
  - Municipality and town: 81 km^{2} (31 sq mi)
- Elevation: 2,600 m (8,500 ft)

Population (2015)
  - Municipality and town: 1,110
  - Density: 14/km^{2} (35/sq mi)
  - Urban: 267
- Time zone: UTC-5 (Colombia Standard Time)
- Website: Official website

Sativasur is a town and municipality in the Colombian Department of Boyacá, part of the subregion of the Northern Boyacá Province. It is approximately 132 km from Tunja, the capital of the department. Sativasur borders the municipalities Sativanorte in the north, Socotá in the east and Paz de Río in the south and west.

== History ==
Sativanorte and Sativasur were called Sátiva in the times before the Spanish conquest of the Muisca on the central highlands (Altiplano Cundiboyacense) of Colombia. Sátiva was inhabited during the Herrera Period and later ruled by the cacique of Tundama, today known as Duitama and part of the Muisca Confederation, the former country of the Muisca. The Spanish conquistadores who conquered the area in 1540 were Gonzalo Suárez Rendón and Hernán Pérez de Quesada. Sativasur was properly founded on January 30, 1720.

The names for Sativasur and Sativanorte are derived from the cacique Sátiva, which in the Chibcha language of the Muisca means: "Captain of the Sun".

== Economy ==
The main economical activities of the village are agriculture, livestock farming and mining.

== Gallery ==
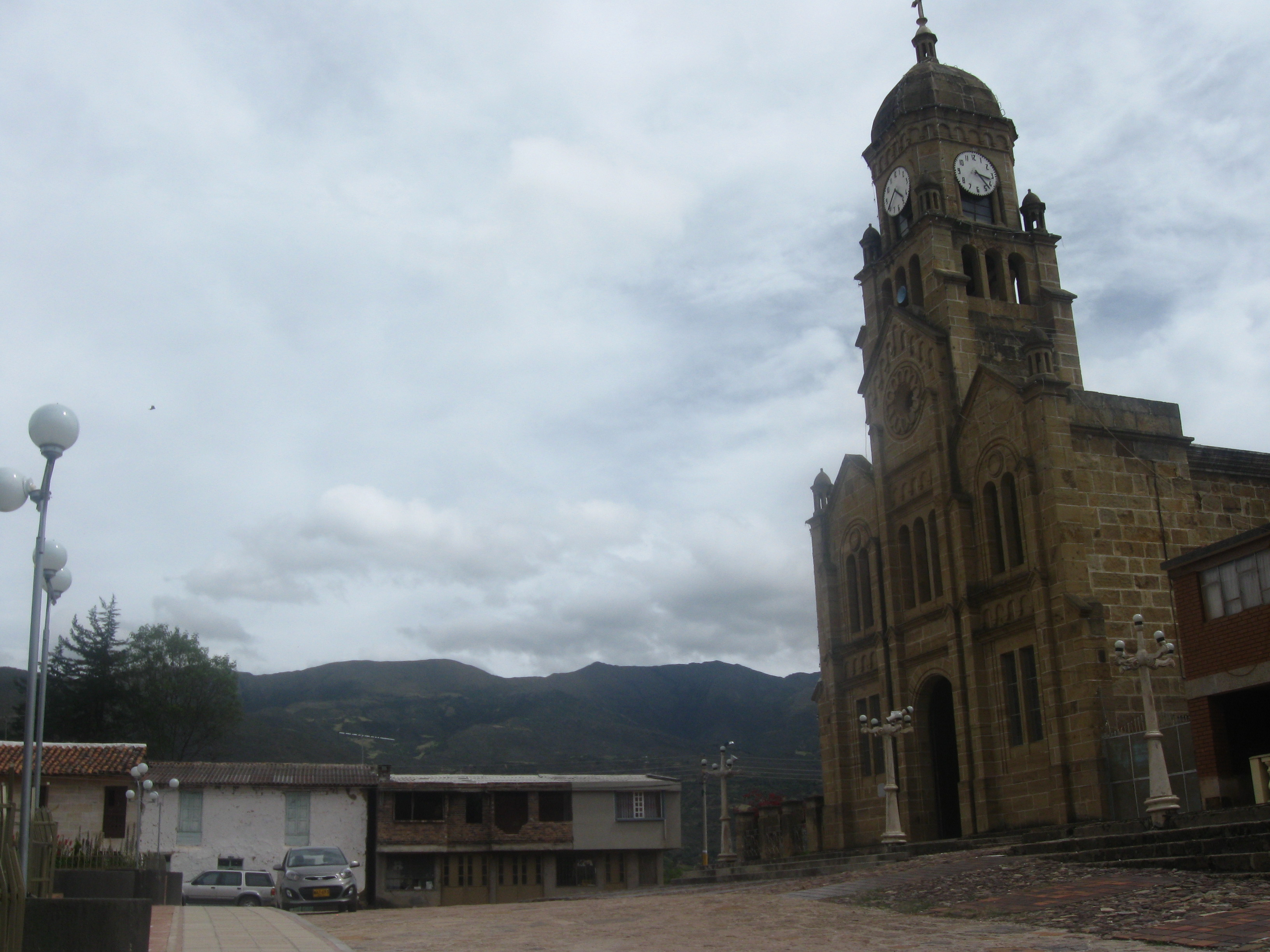
Church of Sativasur

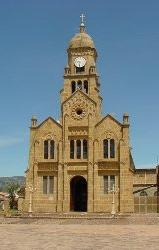
Church

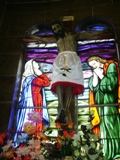
Church interior

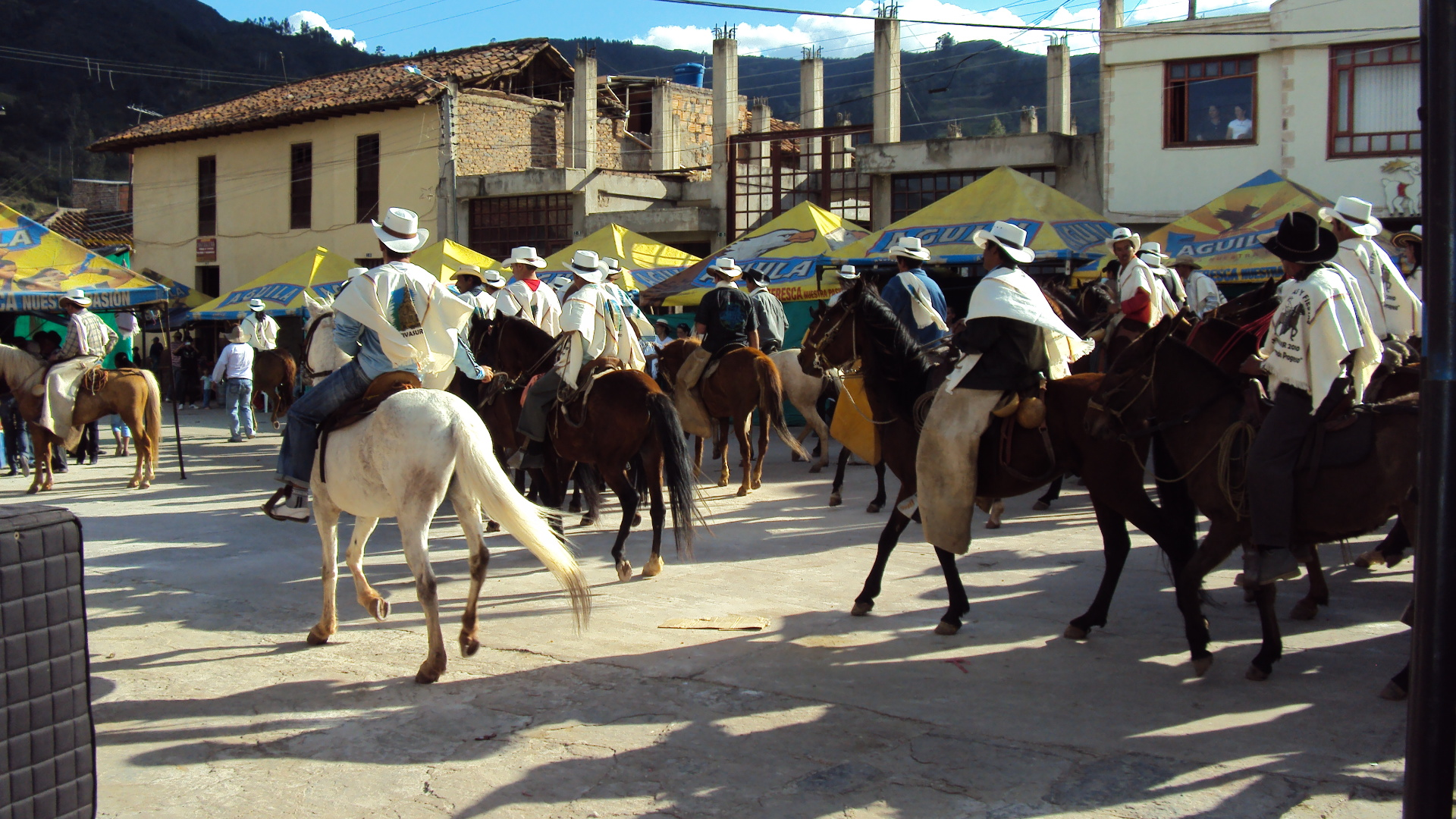
Sativasur festival
