= Tundama (disambiguation) =

Tundama may refer to:

- Tundama, last cacique of Tundama, Colombia
- Duitama, modern name of Tundama, seat of the cacique
- Tundama Province, the province of which Duitama is the capital
