= Gámeza =

Coordinates: 5°48′N 72°48′W

- Municipality and town
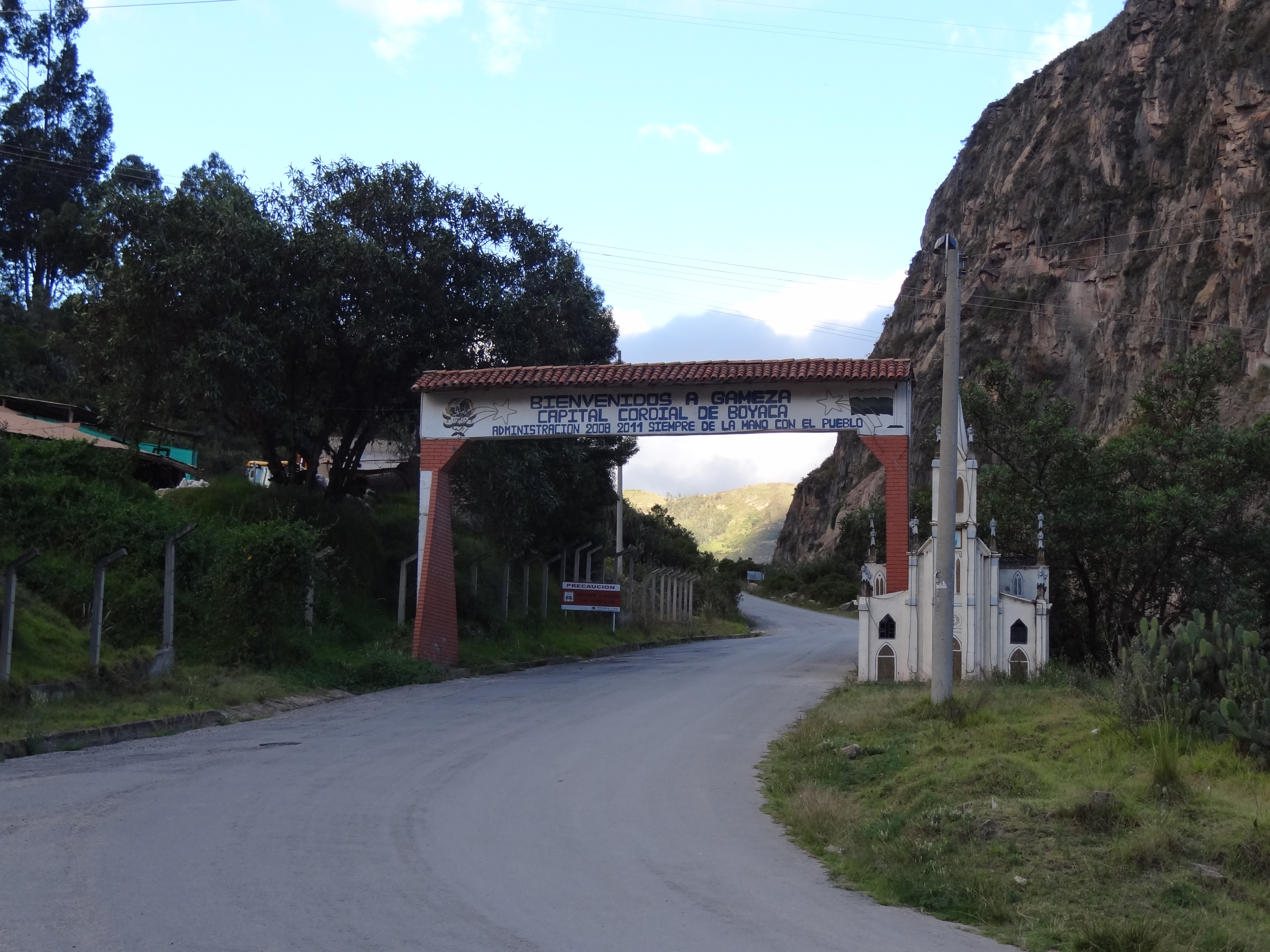
- Town entrance

- Flag

- Location of the municipality and town of Gámeza in the Boyacá Department of Colombia
- Country: Colombia
- Department: Boyacá Department
- Province: Sugamuxi Province
- Founded: 4 November 1585

Government
  - Mayor: José Alirio Ochica Pérez (2020–2023)

Area
  - Municipality and town: 88 km^{2} (34 sq mi)
  - Urban: 70 km^{2} (27 sq mi)
- Elevation: 2,750 m (9,020 ft)

Population (2015)
  - Municipality and town: 4,856
  - Density: 55/km^{2} (140/sq mi)
  - Urban: 1,566
- Time zone: UTC-5 (Colombia Standard Time)
- Website: Official website

Gámeza (Spanish pronunciation: [ˈɣamesa]) is a town and municipality in the Colombian Department of Boyacá, part of the Sugamuxi Province, a subregion of Boyacá. The town center is located at 18 kilometres (11 mi) from Sogamoso and the municipality borders Tasco and Corrales in the north, Tópaga and Mongua in the south, in the east Socotá and westward of Gámeza Corrales and Tópaga.

== History ==
Before the Spanish conquest of the Muisca in the 1530s, Gámeza was inhabited first by indigenous groups during the Herrera Period and later part of the Muisca Confederation, the former country of the Muisca in the central highlands (Altiplano Cundiboyacense) of Colombia. The confederation was ruled by zaques in Hunza (present-day Tunja), zipas in Bacatá and caciques of other villages. Gámeza was part of the reign of the iraca of Sugamuxi, currently known as Sogamoso.

With the election of a new ruler of Sugamuxi, the cacique of Gámeza was consulted, together with the leaders of Busbanzá, Toca, Boyacá and Pesca among the nobles of Firavitoba and Tobasía. In case of conflict, the ruler of Tundama would intervene.

The first Europeans encountering the Muisca were the troops led by conquistador Gonzalo Jiménez de Quesada in 1537. The last zaque beaten by the Spanish soldiers was Aquiminzaque whose primary wife was the daughter of the cacique of Gámeza.

Gámeza was conquered and Spanish missionaries were sent to convert the indigenous people to catholicism. On November 4, 1585 Gámeza was properly founded.

The name Gámeza comes from Gamza, name of the cacique of the village. Gá and za in the Chibcha language of the Muisca mean "serf of the Sun" and "night" respectively.

== Geography ==
Gámeza is located in the Eastern Ranges of the Colombian Andes. In the area gold deposits are present and the Chicamocha River originates in Gámeza.

== Economy ==
Main economical activities in Gámeza are dairy farming and agriculture; potatoes, peas, maize, wheat and barley. Coal mining forms another important source of income for the villagers.

== Gallery ==
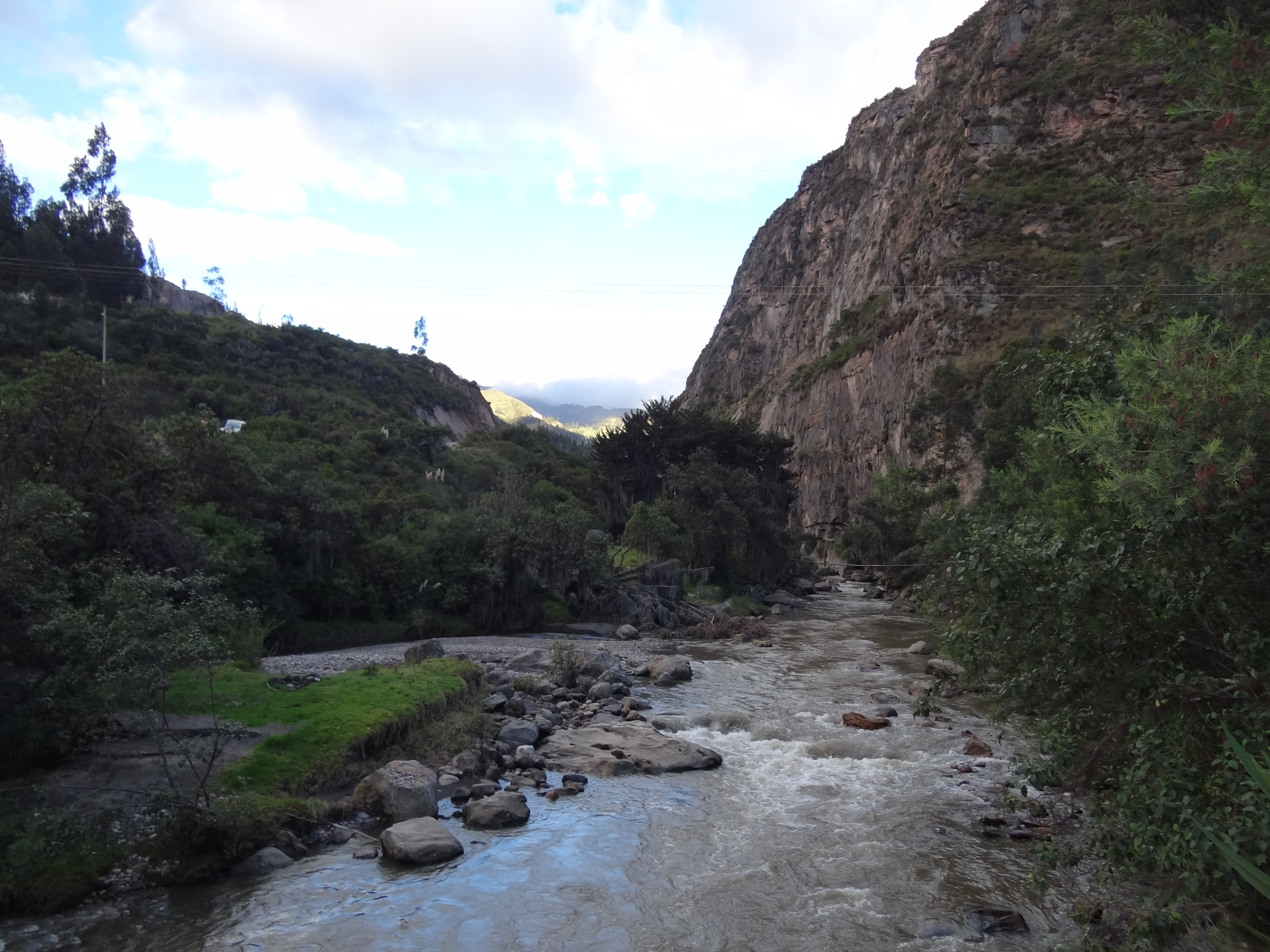
Gámeza River

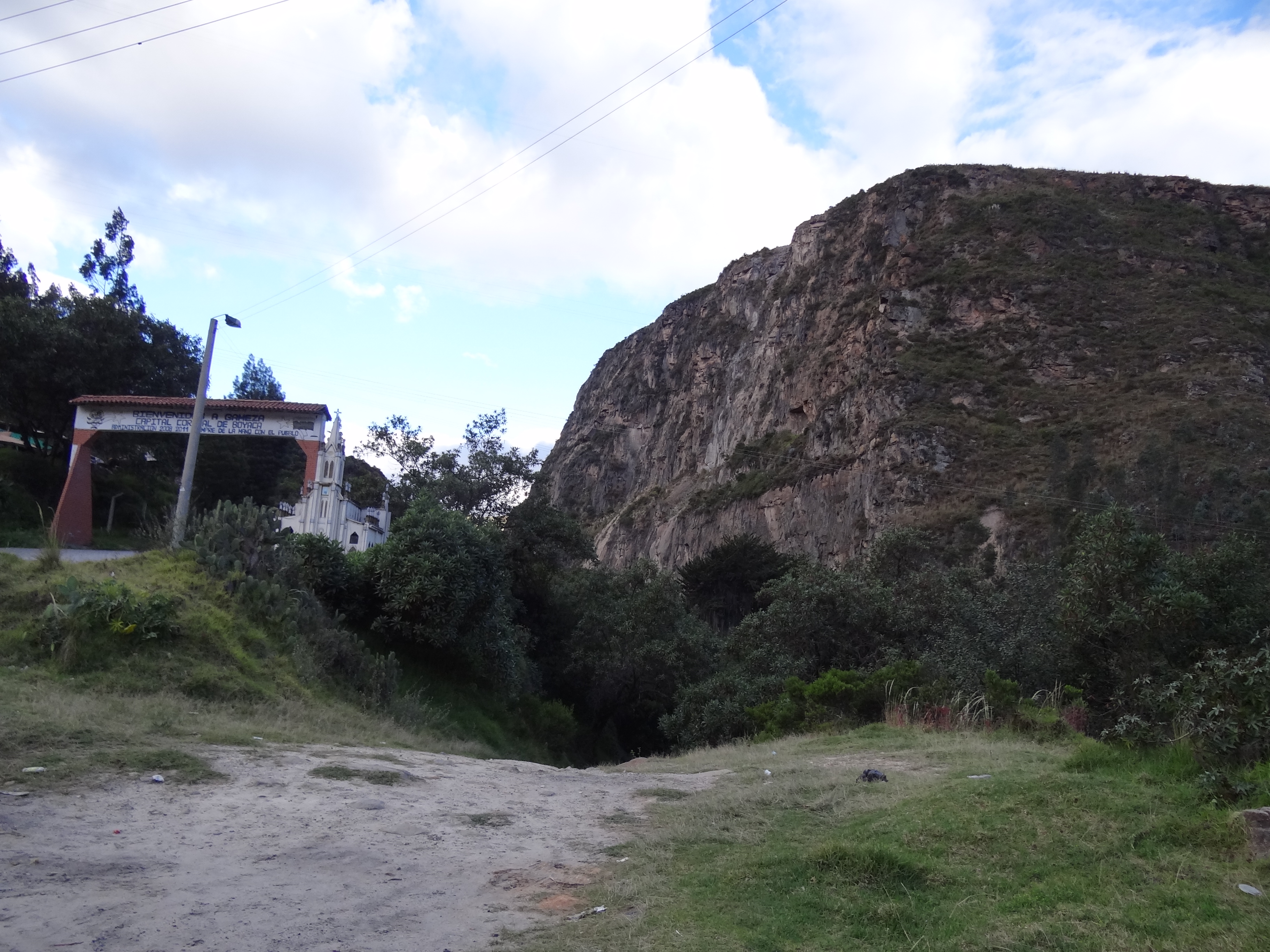
Gámeza River at village entrance

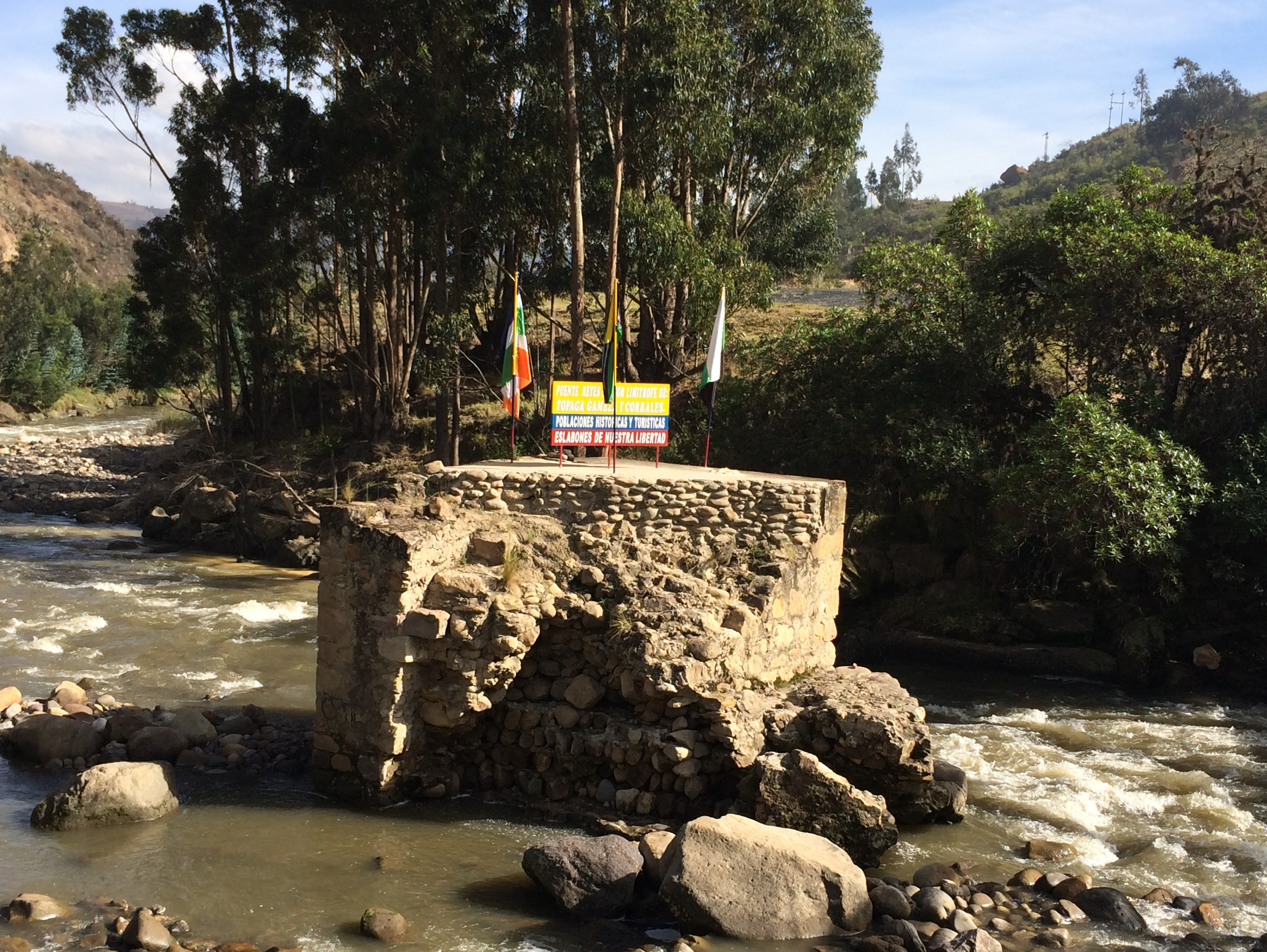
Former bridge over the Gámeza River
