= Tundama =

Tribal leader

- cacique
- Reign: until 1539
- Predecessor: unknown
- Successor: Don Juan
- Born: 15th century Muisca Confederation
- Died: end of December 1539; Duitama, New Kingdom of Granada

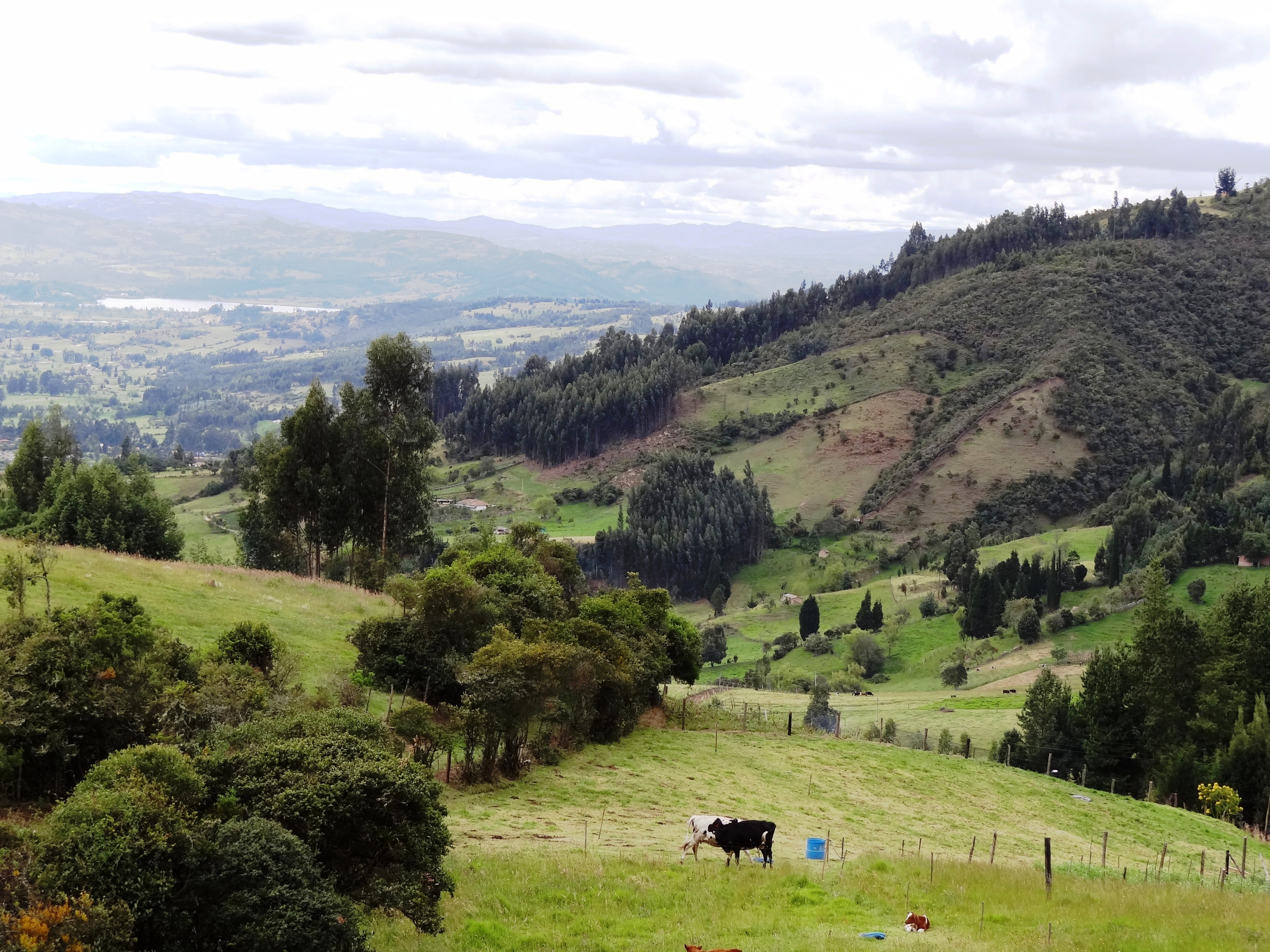
Landscape of Duitama, seat of Tundama

Tundama or Saymoso (15th century – late December 1539 in Duitama) was a cacique of the Muisca Confederation, a loose confederation of different rulers of the Muisca who inhabited the central highlands (Altiplano Cundiboyacense) of the Colombian Andes. The city of Tundama, currently known as Duitama and part of the Tundama Province, Boyacá, were named after the cacique. Tundama ruled over the northernmost territories of the Muisca, submitted last by the Spanish conquistadores.

Tundama was killed late December 1539 with a large hammer by Spanish conquistador Baltasar Maldonado. His successor, Don Juan was killed shortly after, ending the reign of the Muisca in the New Kingdom of Granada, the name for present-day Colombia and a part of Venezuela in the Spanish Empire.

Knowledge about Tundama has been compiled by scholar Lucas Fernández de Piedrahita.

== Background ==
In the time before the Spanish conquest of central Colombia, there were several main rulers and several independent caciques who governed the Muisca. From south to north the psihipqua of Muyquytá, the hoa of Hunza, the iraca of Sugamuxi and the psihipqua of Tundama were the ruling elites of the area. Duitama in those ages was a lake surrounded by hilltops. On the hill La Tolosa the tundama lived in a bohío (hut) ornamented with golden figures.

== Biography ==
Tundama was the last cacique of Duitama and the caciques of Cerinza, Chitagoto, Icabuco, Lupacoche, Sátiva, Soatá and Susacón were loyal to him. When a new iraca for Sugamuxi had to be elected alternating between the caciques of Firavitoba and Tobasía, the cacique of Tundama intervened in case of conflict.

=== Spanish conquest and death ===
In 1536 the Spanish conquistadores led by Licentiate Gonzalo Jiménez de Quesada set foot towards the interior of modern-day Colombia from Santa Marta. looking for the beginning of the Magdalena River, and a land path ro Peru, and equipped with approximately 800 soldiers, an unknown number of native companions, black slaves, and dozens of horses they started their march to the Andes along the Magdalena River. The Spanish troops arrived first in the southern Muisca territories, in the early March of 1537. From there they marched north and in August of that year they conquered Hunza, a capital of the northern Muisca. They were informed of the sacred Iraka Valley around Sugamuxi and found the Sun Temple which soldiers of De Quesada burned by accident in September 1537.

Saymoso got notice of the submission of the neighbouring indigenous groups, the Panche, Guane and others and told his guecha warriors not to bow for the Spanish invaders. When one of his warriors suggested surrender was the best option, Tundama cut off his ears and left hand. The cacique declared a "death war" against the Spanish and gathered an army of 10,000 guecha warriors.

To keep the conquistadores away, he sent a delegation of his people with emeralds, gold and mantles to offer the Spanish with the promise that Tundama would surrender bringing eight more of these. Gaining time, Tundama hid his treasures and prepared the defence of Tundama.

On December 15, 1539, captain Baltasar Maldonado, a companion of Jiménez de Quesada (who had already left for Europe, to give account in Spain), entered the territories of Tundama and offered him a peace proposal if he would surrender. Tundama, informed by the Spanish murders of psihipqua Tisquesusa and hoa Eucaneme, did not accept and Maldonado attacked Tundama and his army on the island in Vargas Swamp, where 280 years later the Battle of Vargas Swamp by Simón Bolívar would be fought. Maldonado, enforced with 2000 yanakunas; natives from Peru and allied people from Muyquytá and Ramiriquí, was accompanied by the Muisca whose ears and hand had been cut off by Tundama. The Spanish conquistador with his weapons, cavalry and the inside knowledge of the earless Muisca killed 4000 guecha warriors of Tundama. Seeing this battle was fruitless, Tundama fled to Cerinza to ally with the cacique from there and prepared a new attack on the Spanish and indigenous troops, losing again. The caciques of northern Boyacá convinced Tundama to not fight anymore and Tundama surrendered to the Spanish troops. Maldonado demanded huge quantities of gold and emeralds to pay his loss to the Spanish. When handing over the valuables, Maldonado deemed the payments not enough and before the end of the year Maldonado killed Tundama with a large hammer.

After Tundama was killed, according to the Muisca tradition of inheritance, his nephew Don Juan took over the role of cacique. He was killed shortly after, ending the era of the Muisca in northern Boyacá. The last independent of the Muisca, Aquiminzaque, was killed by public decapitation by Hernán Pérez de Quesada in January 1540. Native caciques continued ruling their towns, working together with a Spanish encomendero.

=== Tundama in Muisca history ===
History of the Muisca
Altiplano	Muisca	Art	Architecture	Astronomy	Cuisine	El Dorado	Subsistence	Women	Conquest

== See also ==
- Spanish conquest of the Muisca
- Muisca
- Muisca Confederation
- iraca
