= Anchiopsis =

Anchiopsis Temporal range: Early-Mid Devonian ~412–384 Ma

Scientific classification
- Domain: Eukaryota
- Kingdom: Animalia
- Phylum: Arthropoda
- Class: †Trilobita
- Order: †Phacopida
- Family: †Dalmanitidae
- Genus: †Anchiopsis; Delo, 1935

Genus of trilobites

Anchiopsis is a genus of trilobite in the order Phacopida, which existed in what is now New York, U.S.A. It was described by Delo in 1935, and the type species is Anchiopsis anchiops, which was originally described as Calymene anchiops by Green in 1832.

== Distribution ==
Fossils of Anchiopsis have been found in Canada (Ontario), Colombia (Floresta Formation, Floresta, Boyacá), and the United States (Indiana and New York).
