= Eduardo Grimaldi =

Colombian ecologist

Eduardo Grimaldi (1929–2010) was a Colombian ecologist whose work included projects to combat erosion and restoration work in the "Cerros Orientales" (Eastern mountains) in Bogotá after fire in the early 1970s. He was born in Belén, Boyacá, Colombia and died in Bogotá.

In his early years, he published several articles in many Colombian magazines and papers. He was one of the closest friends of Rogelio Salmona.

== Sources ==
- Article about his work in Cali, Colombia (Spanish)
- Article about his work in Cali, Colombia (Spanish)
- Interview Tunja, Colombia (Spanish)
- Article about his work in Moniquira, Colombia (Spanish)
