= Busbanzá =

Coordinates: 5°49′N 72°52′W

- Municipality and town
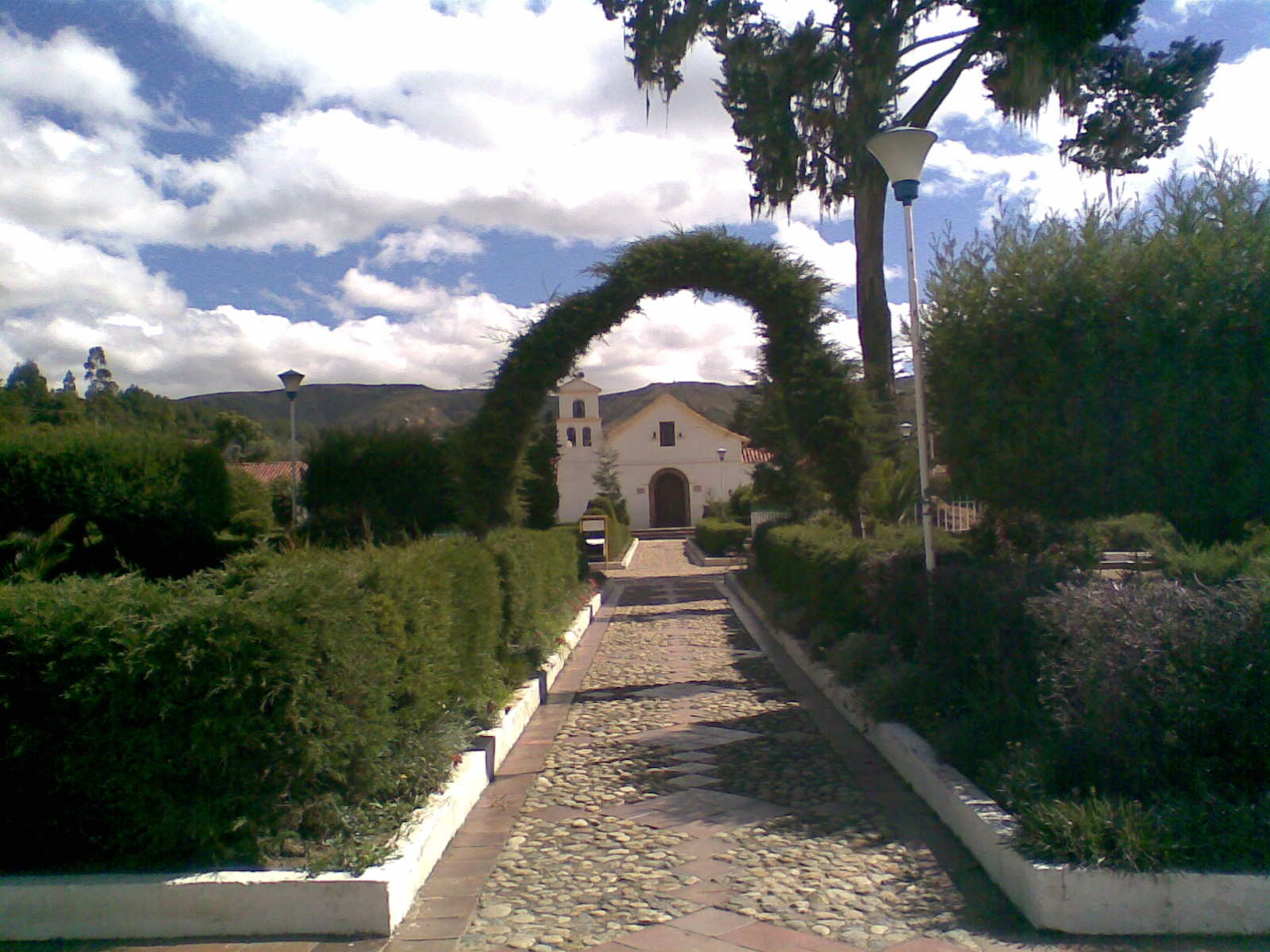
- Park and chapel Busbanzá

- Flag Coat of arms

- Location of the municipality and town of Busbanzá in the Boyacá Department of Colombia
- Country: Colombia
- Department: Boyacá Department
- Province: Tundama Province
- Founded: 5 January 1602
- Founder: Luis Enríquez

Government
  - Mayor: Rodolfo Torres (2024–2027)

Area
  - Municipality and town: 22.5 km^{2} (8.7 sq mi)
  - Urban: 5 km^{2} (1.9 sq mi)
- Elevation: 2,472 m (8,110 ft)

Population (2025)
  - Municipality and town: 1,219
  - Density: 54.2/km^{2} (140/sq mi)
- Time zone: UTC-5 (Colombia Standard Time)
- Website: Official website

Busbanzá (Spanish pronunciation: [buzβanˈsa]) is a town and municipality in the Colombian Department of Boyacá. Busbanzá is part of the Tundama Province, a subregion of Boyacá. Busbanzá is located at 25 kilometres (16 mi) from Sogamoso. It borders Betéitiva in the north, in the east and south Corrales and in the west Floresta.

== History ==
The first inhabitants of Busbanzá settled there from the Eastern Llanos near a former lake. They were the ancestors of the Muisca of Busbanzá and organized themselves in the cacicazgos of the Iraka Valley, together with Gámeza, Tobasía, Firavitoba, Iza, Pesca, Toca, Tota, Yaconí, Guaquira, Monquirá. According to the religion of the Muisca, it was bearded messenger god Bochica who educated the people to organize themselves in a theocracy. He allegedly ordered the leaders of Busbanzá, Gámeza, Pesca and Toca to choose a new ruler and priest for the Sun Temple in Sogamoso alternating between caciques of Firavitoba and Tobasía.

On September 4, 1537 the Spanish conquistadores entered the Iraka Valley and submitted the area to their new reign. Modern Busbanzá was founded on January 5, 1602.

Busbanzá is named after the cacique Boazá.

== Economy ==
Main economical activities of Busbanzá are agriculture (potatoes, wheat, barley, potatoes and maize) and livestock farming.

== Born in Busbanzá ==
- Rodolfo Torres, professional cyclist

== Gallery ==
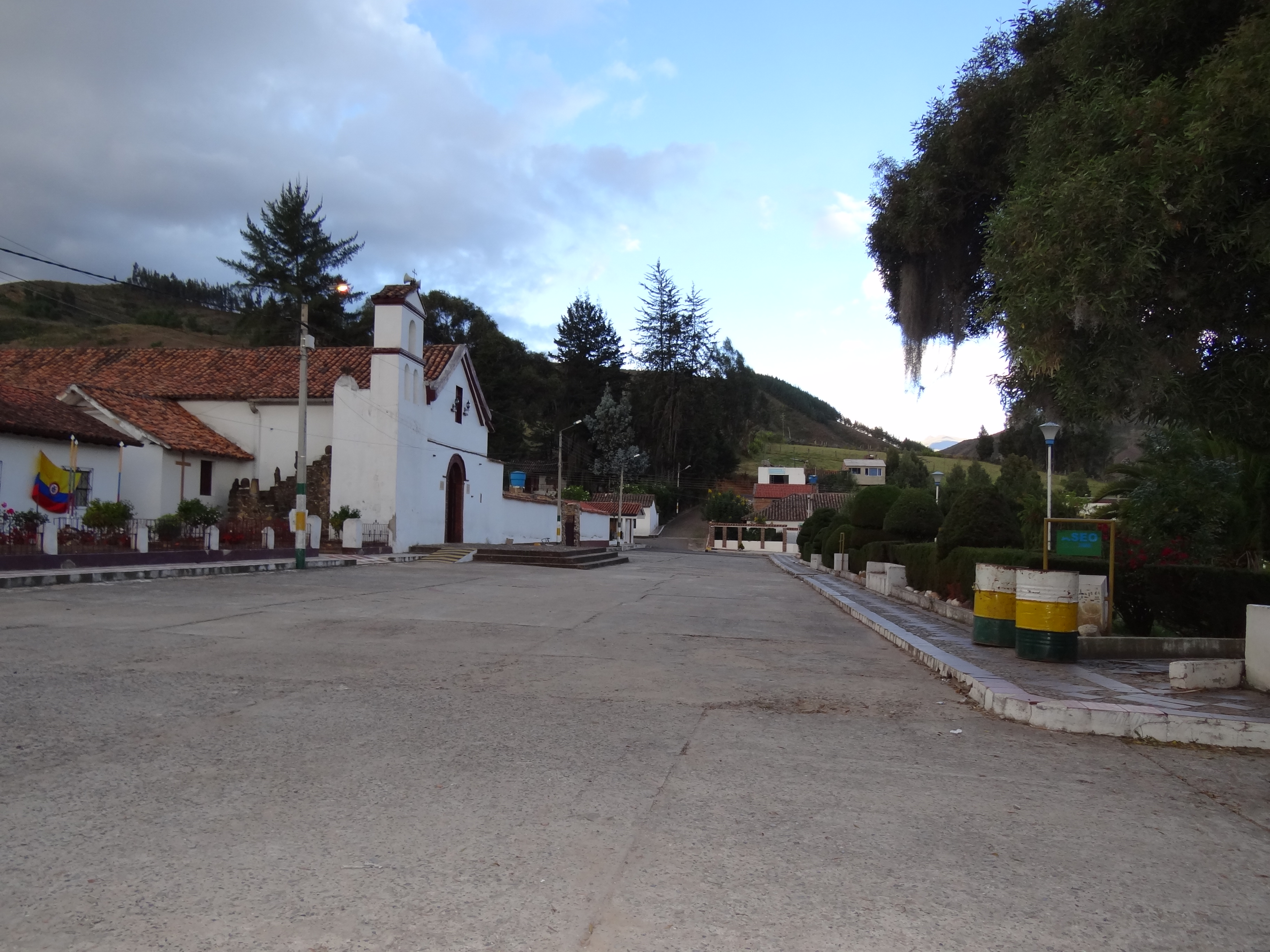
Central square

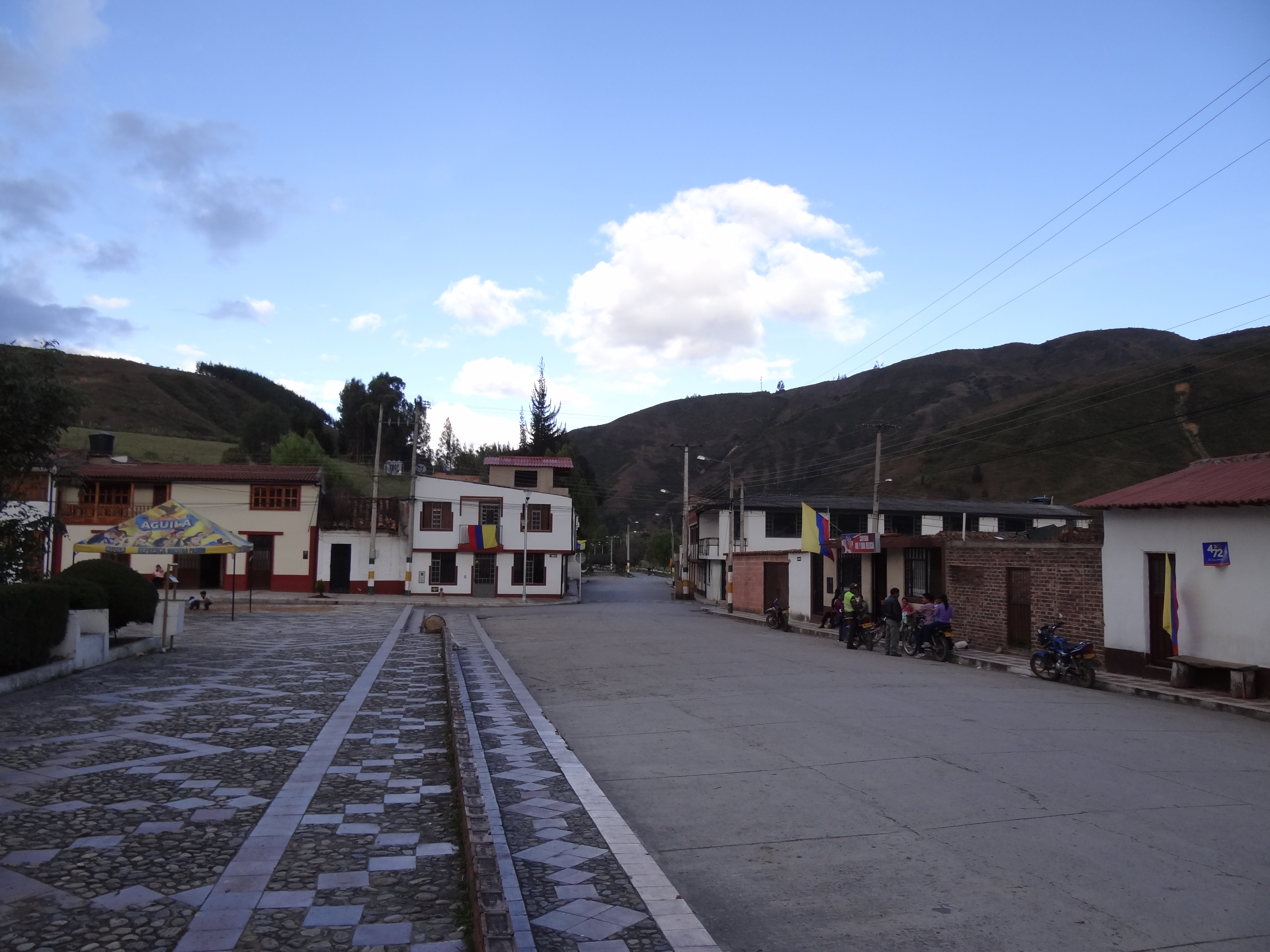
Road view

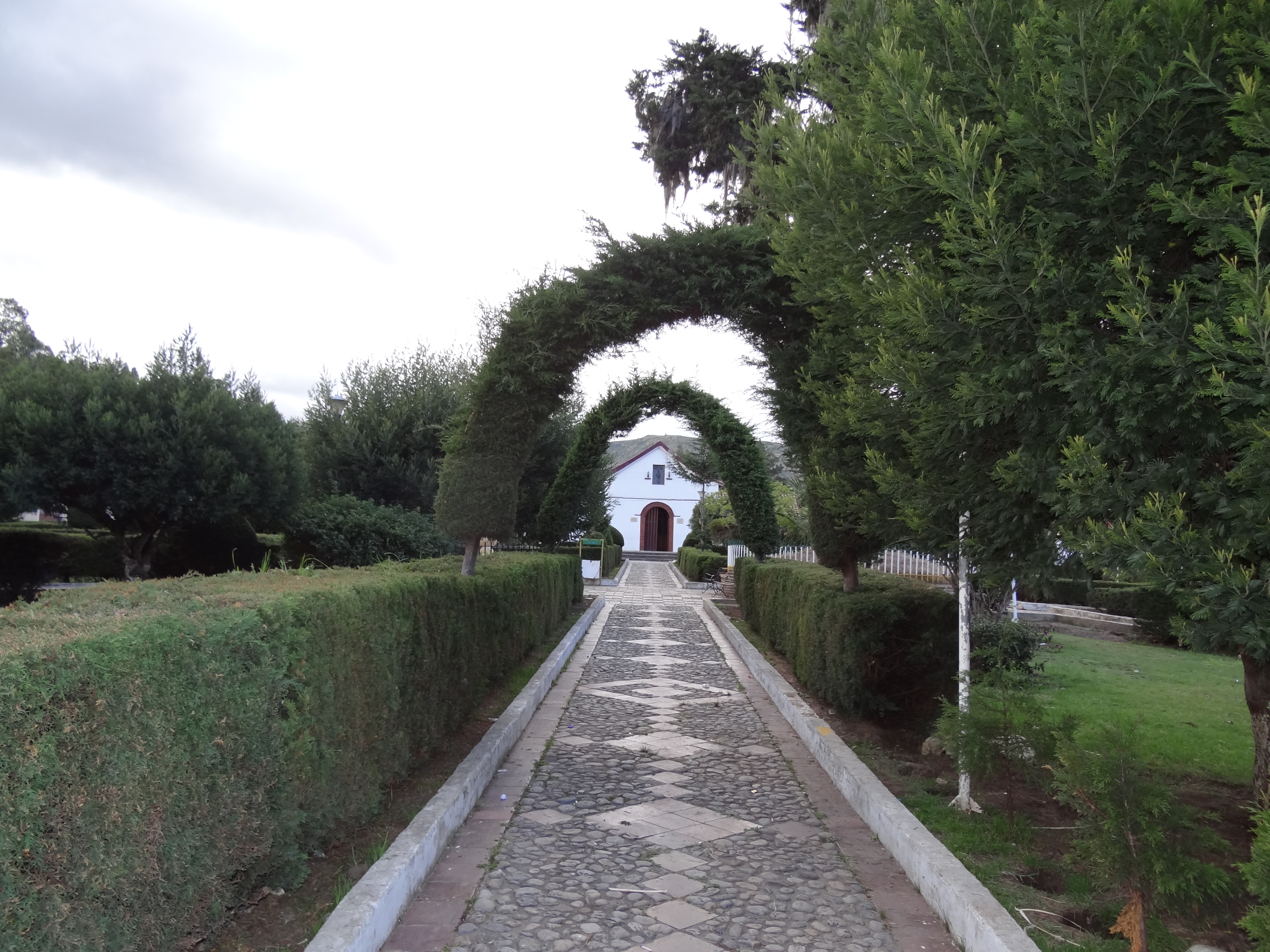
Park
