= Cerinza =

Coordinates: 6°00′N 72°55′W

- Municipality and town
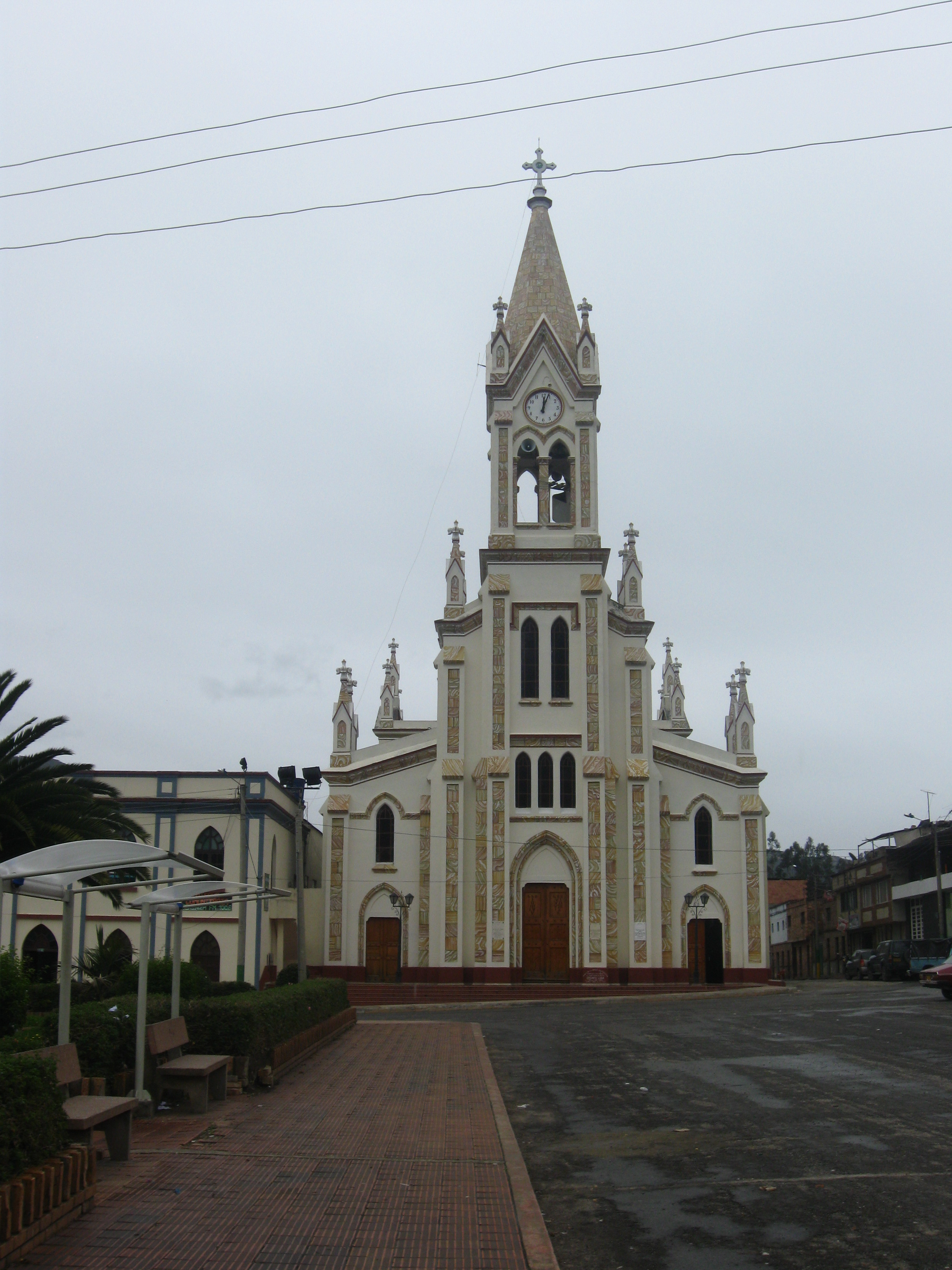
- Church of Cerinza

- Flag

- Location of the municipality and town of Cerinza in the Boyacá Department of Colombia
- Country: Colombia
- Department: Boyacá Department
- Province: Tundama Province
- Founded: 7 January 1554
- Founder: Melchor Vanegas

Government
  - Mayor: Juan Alcibíades Cely Amaya (2020-2023)

Area
  - Municipality and town: 61.63 km^{2} (23.80 sq mi)
  - Urban: 0.41 km^{2} (0.16 sq mi)
- Elevation: 2,750 m (9,020 ft)

Population (2015)
  - Municipality and town: 3,762
  - Density: 61.04/km^{2} (158.1/sq mi)
  - Urban: 1,547
- Time zone: UTC-5 (Colombia Standard Time)
- Website: Official website

Cerinza is a town and municipality in the Colombian Department of Boyacá, and part of the Tundama Province subregion. Cerinza borders Belén in the northeast, Encino in the northwest, Santander in the west, Santa Rosa de Viterbo in the south, Floresta in the south-southeast and Betéitiva in the east-southeast.

== History ==
Before the Spanish conquest of the Muisca of the Altiplano Cundiboyacense, the area of Cerinza was ruled by the cacique of Tundama, present-day Duitama. The cacicazgo was part of the Muisca Confederation, the former country in the central highlands of the Colombian Andes. The Muisca spoke Chibcha and in that language Cerinza means "my throat". The village was named after the cacique with the same name.

Modern Cerinza was founded on 7 January 1554 by Melchor Vanegas, after conquistador Gonzalo Jiménez de Quesada entered the village in 1538.

== Economy ==
The main economic activities in Cerinza are livestock farming and agriculture (potatoes, maize, peas and beans).

== Gallery ==
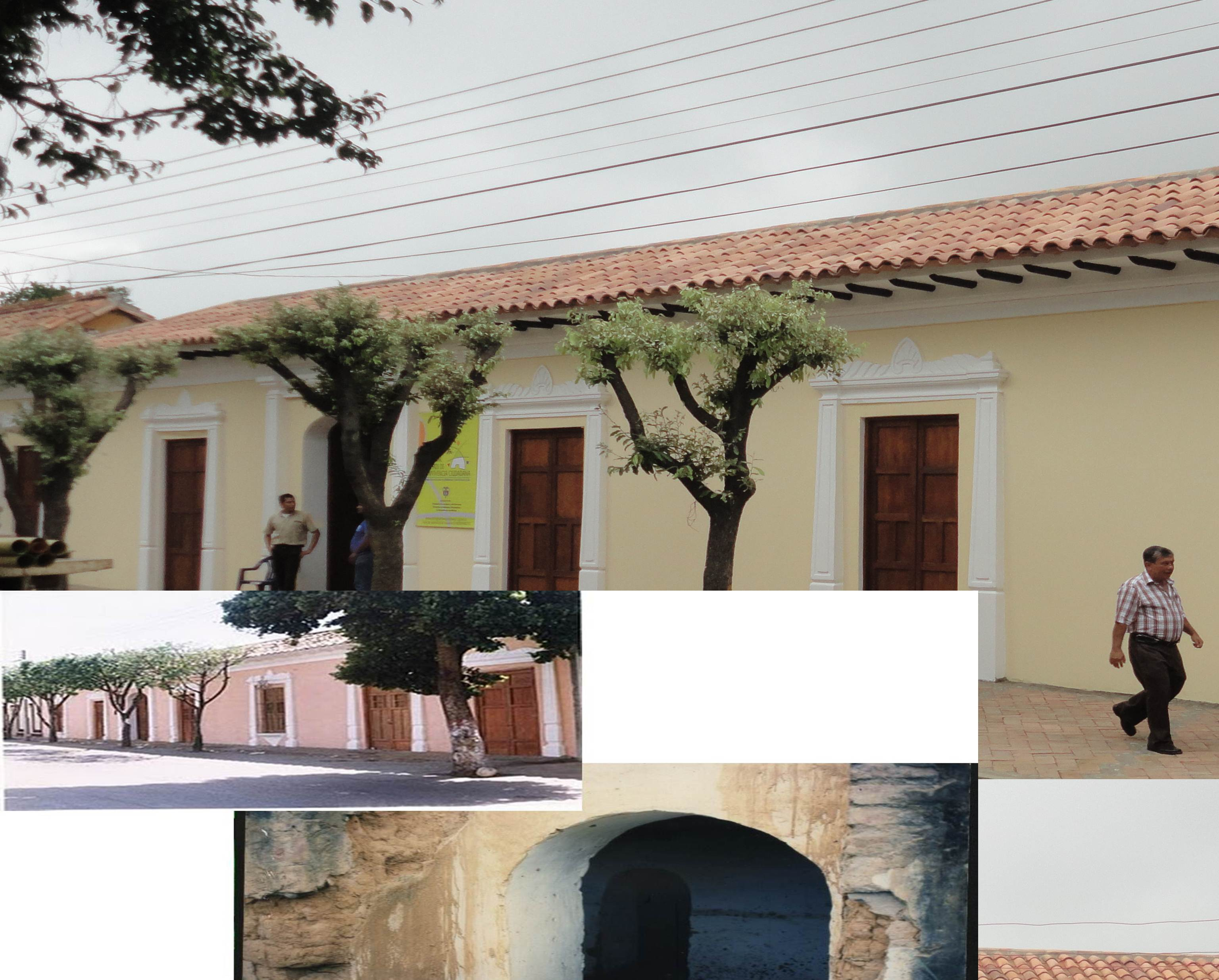
Hospital of Cerinza

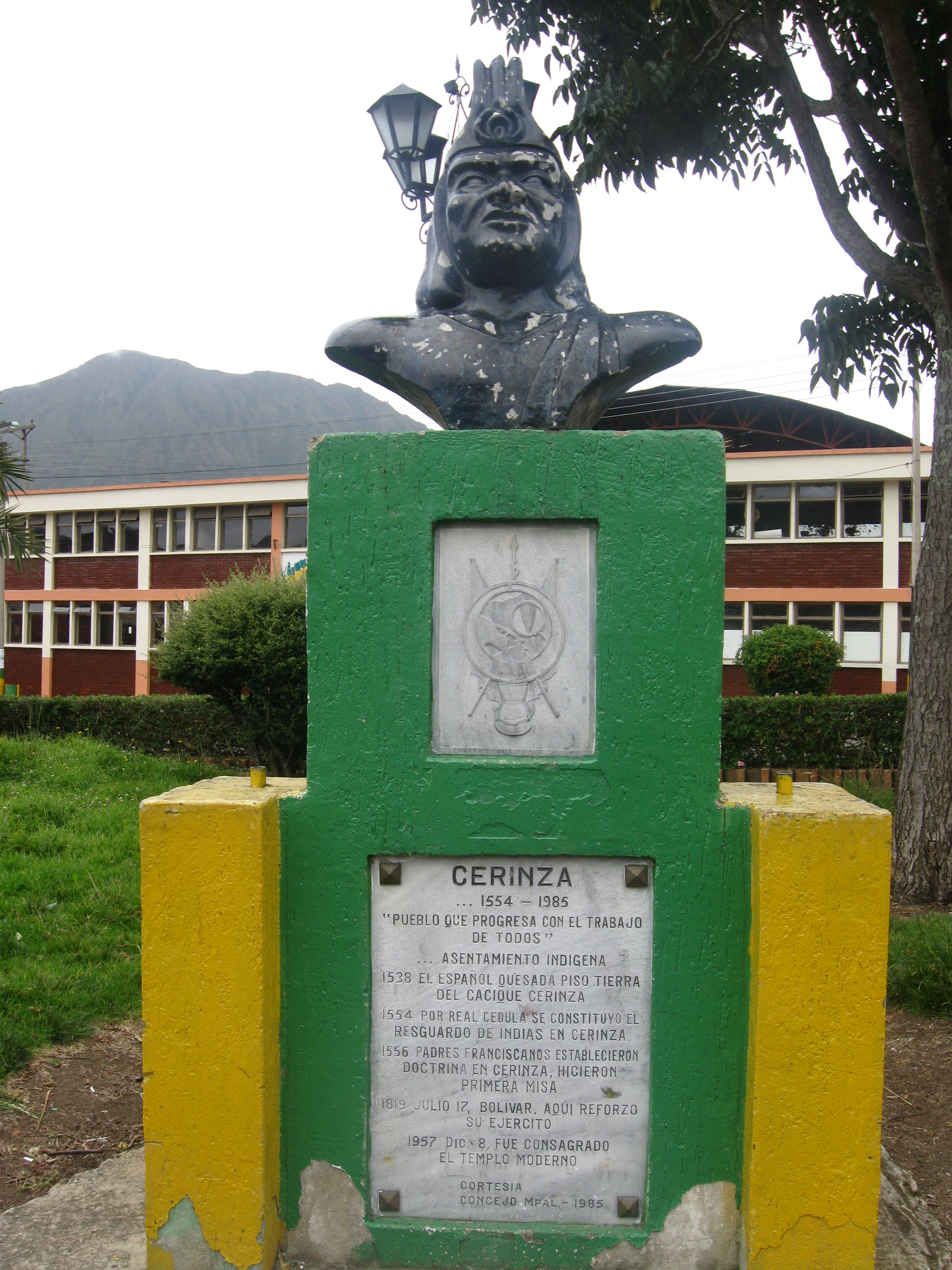
Monument honouring the Muisca
