= Cordania =

Cordania Temporal range: Early-Mid Devonian ~416–392 Ma

Scientific classification
- Kingdom: Animalia
- Phylum: Arthropoda
- Clade: †Artiopoda
- Class: †Trilobita
- Order: †Proetida
- Family: †Brachymetopidae
- Genus: †Cordania; Clarke, 1892

Species
- C. buicki (Australia); C. falcata (USA); C. gasepiou (Colombia); C. junggarensis (China); C. transversus (China); C. wessmani (USA)

Extinct genus of trilobites

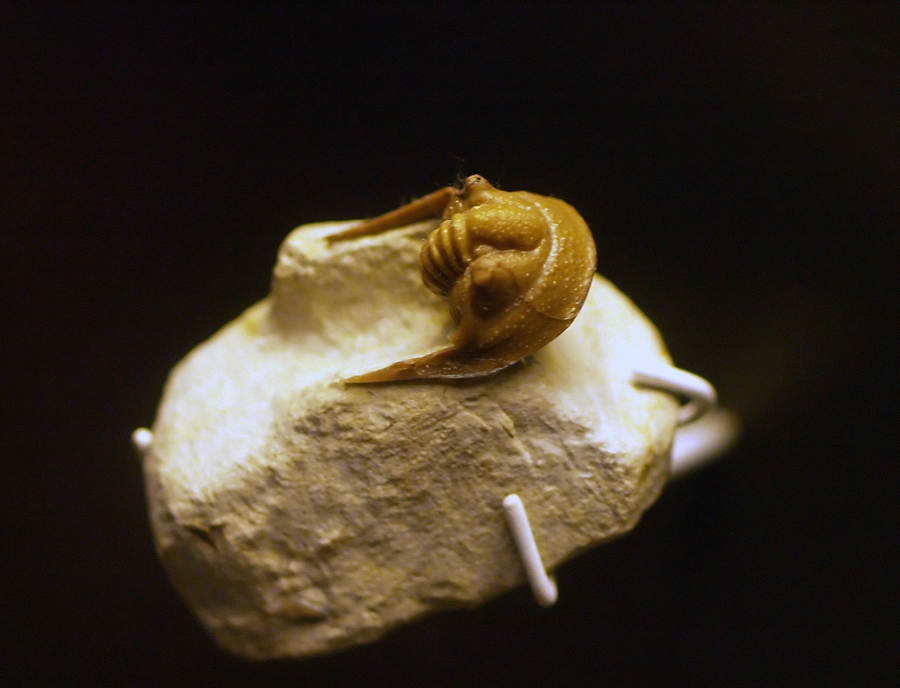
A specimen of Cordania wessmani from the Lower Devonian of Oklahoma

Cordania is an extinct genus of trilobites that lived from the Early to Middle Devonian.

== Distribution ==
Fossils of Cordania have been found in Australia, China, Morocco and the United States (Oklahoma). Also in the Emsian-Givetian Floresta Formation of the Altiplano Cundiboyacense, Colombia, fossils of Cordania have been found.
