= Tundama Province =

Tundama Province Provincia de Tundama
- Province
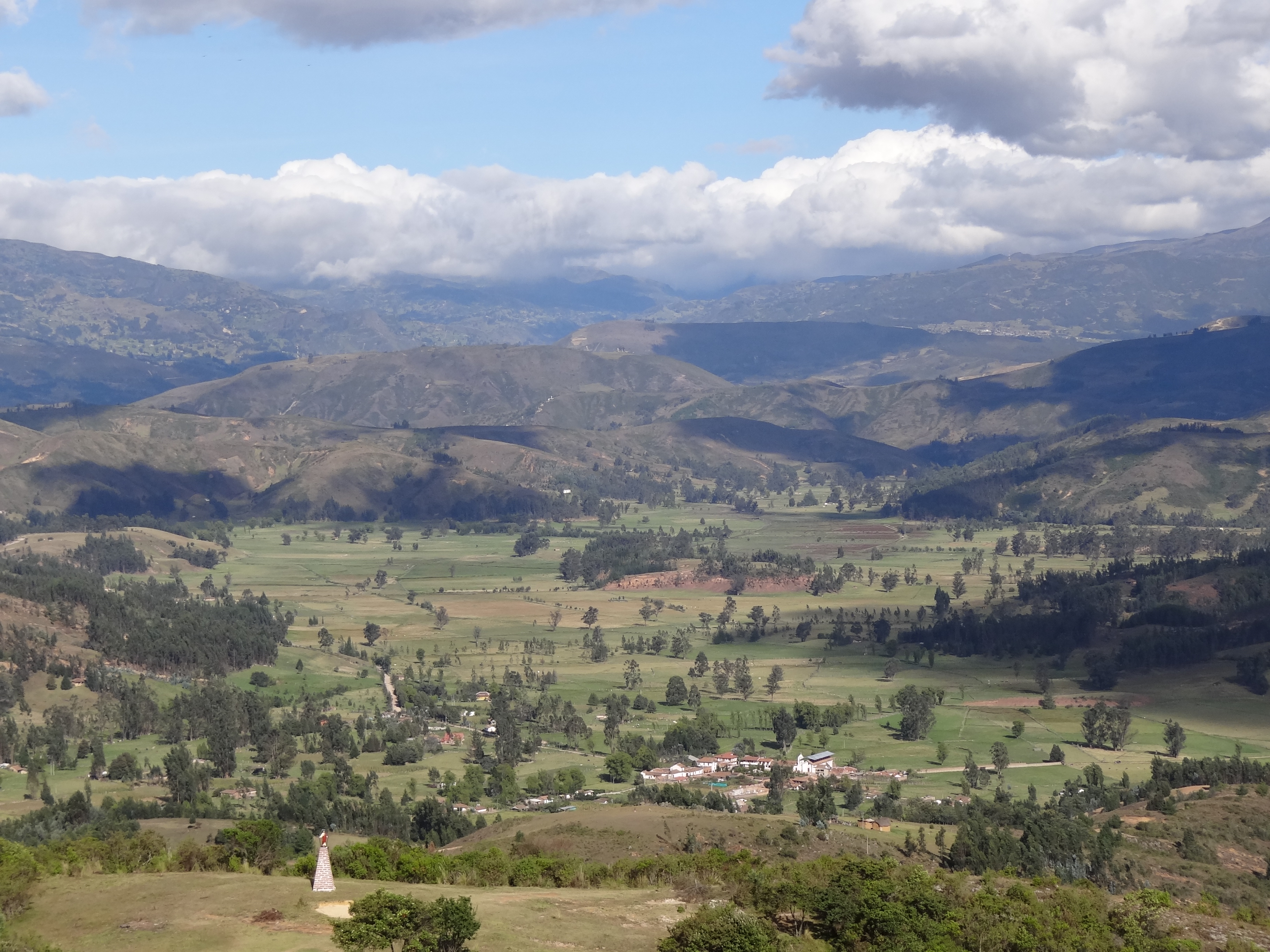
- View of Floresta
- Etymology: Tundama
- Location of Tundama Province in Colombia
- Coordinates: 5°50′00″N 73°01′00″W
- Country: Colombia
- Department: Boyacá
- Capital: Duitama
- Municipalities: 9

Area
  - Total: 1,328.43 km^{2} (512.91 sq mi)

Population (2015)
  - Total: 178,252
  - Density: 134.182/km^{2} (347.531/sq mi)
- Time zone: UTC−5 (COT)
- Indigenous groups: Muisca

The Tundama Province is a province of the Colombian Department of Boyacá. The province is formed by 9 municipalities.

== Etymology ==
The province is named after cacique Tundama.

== Subdivision ==
The Tundama Province comprises 9 municipalities:

Municipality bold is capital	Area km^{2}	Elevation (m) urban centre	Population 2015	Founded	Map
Belén	283.6	2650	7400	1762	
Busbanzá	22.5	2472	1156	1602	
Cerinza	61.63	2750	3762	1554	
Corrales	60.85	2470	2273	1782	
Duitama	266.93	2590	113,105	1819	
Floresta	85	2506	4523	1818	
Paipa	305.92	2525	30,740	1602	
Santa Rosa de Viterbo	107	2753	13,403	1690	
Tutazá	135	2700	1890	1849	
Total	1328.43		178,252		
