= Floresta, Boyacá =

Coordinates: 5°55′N 72°55′W

Floresta Tobasía
- Municipality and town
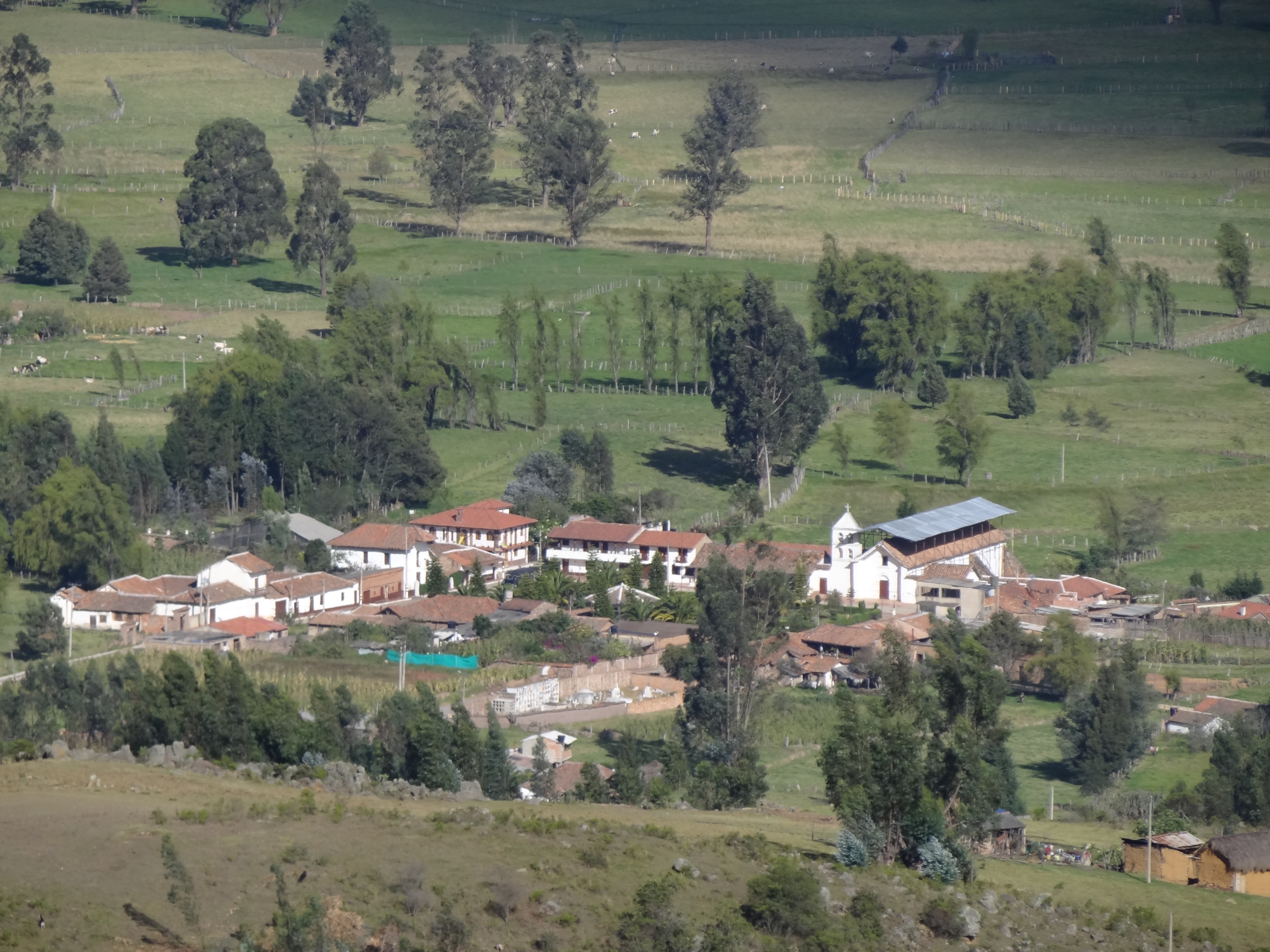
- View of corregimiento Tobasía, part of Floresta

- Flag Coat of arms

- Location of the municipality and town of Floresta in the Boyacá Department of Colombia
- Country: Colombia
- Department: Boyacá Department
- Province: Tundama Province
- Founded: 1818

Government
  - Mayor: Wilmar Julián Rincón Mariño (2020-2023)

Area
  - Municipality and town: 85 km^{2} (33 sq mi)
- Elevation: 2,506 m (8,222 ft)

Population (2015)
  - Municipality and town: 4,523
  - Density: 53/km^{2} (140/sq mi)
  - Urban: 1,798
- Time zone: UTC-5 (Colombia Standard Time)
- Website: Official website

Floresta is a town and municipality in Boyacá Department, Colombia, part of the Tundama Province, a subregion of Boyacá. Floresta is situated on the Altiplano Cundiboyacense in the Eastern Ranges of the Colombian Andes. It borders Santa Rosa de Viterbo, Cerinza and Betéitiva in the north, in the east Busbanzá and Corrales in the west Santa Rosa de Viterbo and Nobsa in the south.

== History ==
Before the Spanish conquest of the highlands of Colombia, the area of Floresta was inhabited by the Muisca, organized in their Muisca Confederation. In those days Floresta, together with Santa Rosa de Viterbo, was called Tobasía which is still the name of a corregimiento of the village. Tobasía was ruled by a cacique loyal to the ruler of Tundama, present-day Duitama.

Modern Floresta was founded in 1818, three years before the independence of Colombia from the Spanish Empire. Floresta means "between the flowers".

== Economy ==
Main economical activity of Floresta is agriculture, predominantly potatoes, maize and barley. Also the Colombian fruit uchuva is produced in Floresta. The municipality grows grapes, races Riesling and Pinot Noir for wine production, uncommon in tropical Colombia. Livestock and dairy farming are other production areas.

== Geology ==
The fossiliferous Devonian Floresta Formation is named after Floresta and has provided many trilobites and brachiopod fossils.

== Born in Floresta ==
- Eliécer Silva Celis, anthropologist and archeologist, reconstructed the Sun Temple in Sogamoso

== Gallery ==
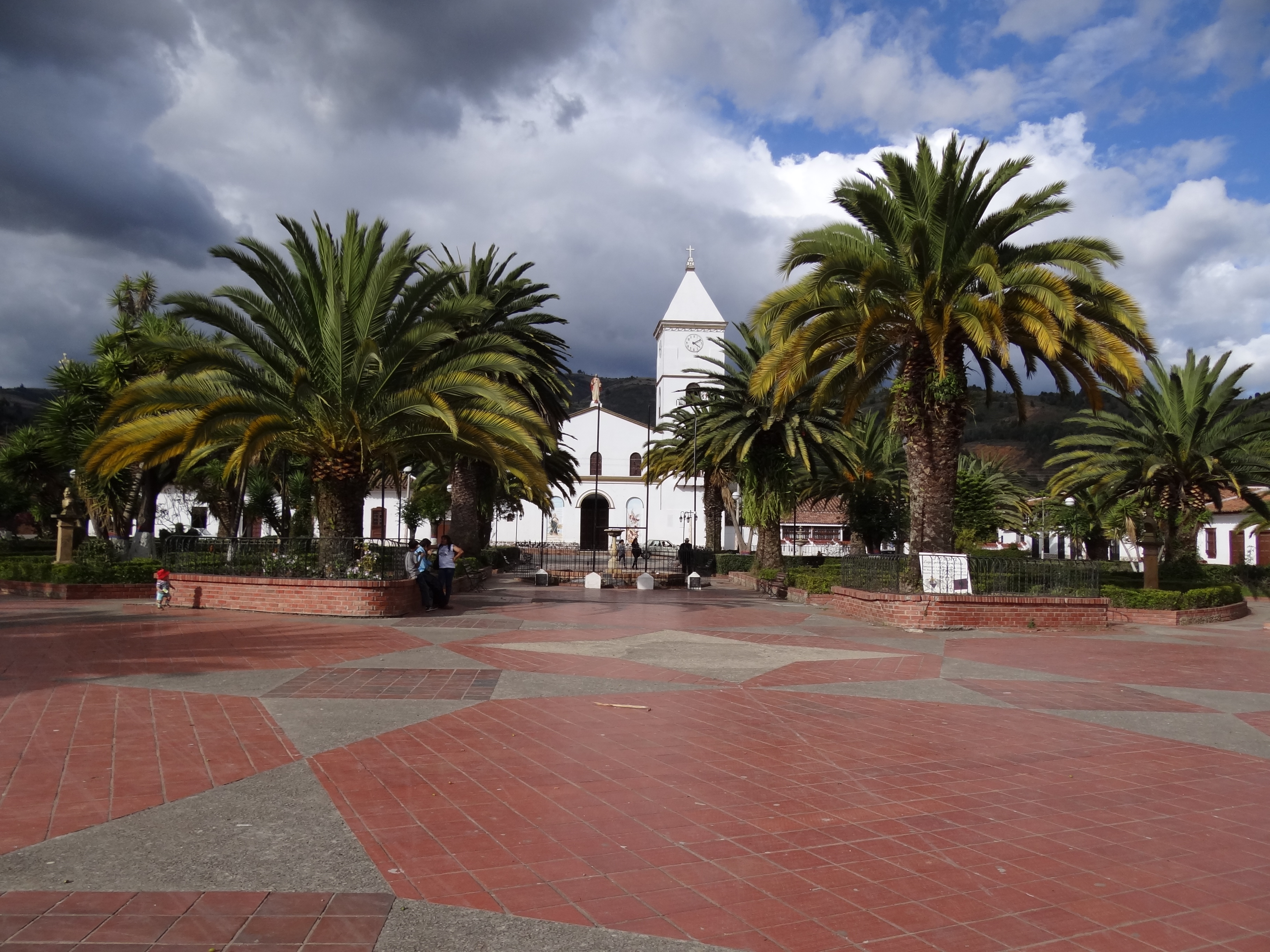
Central square

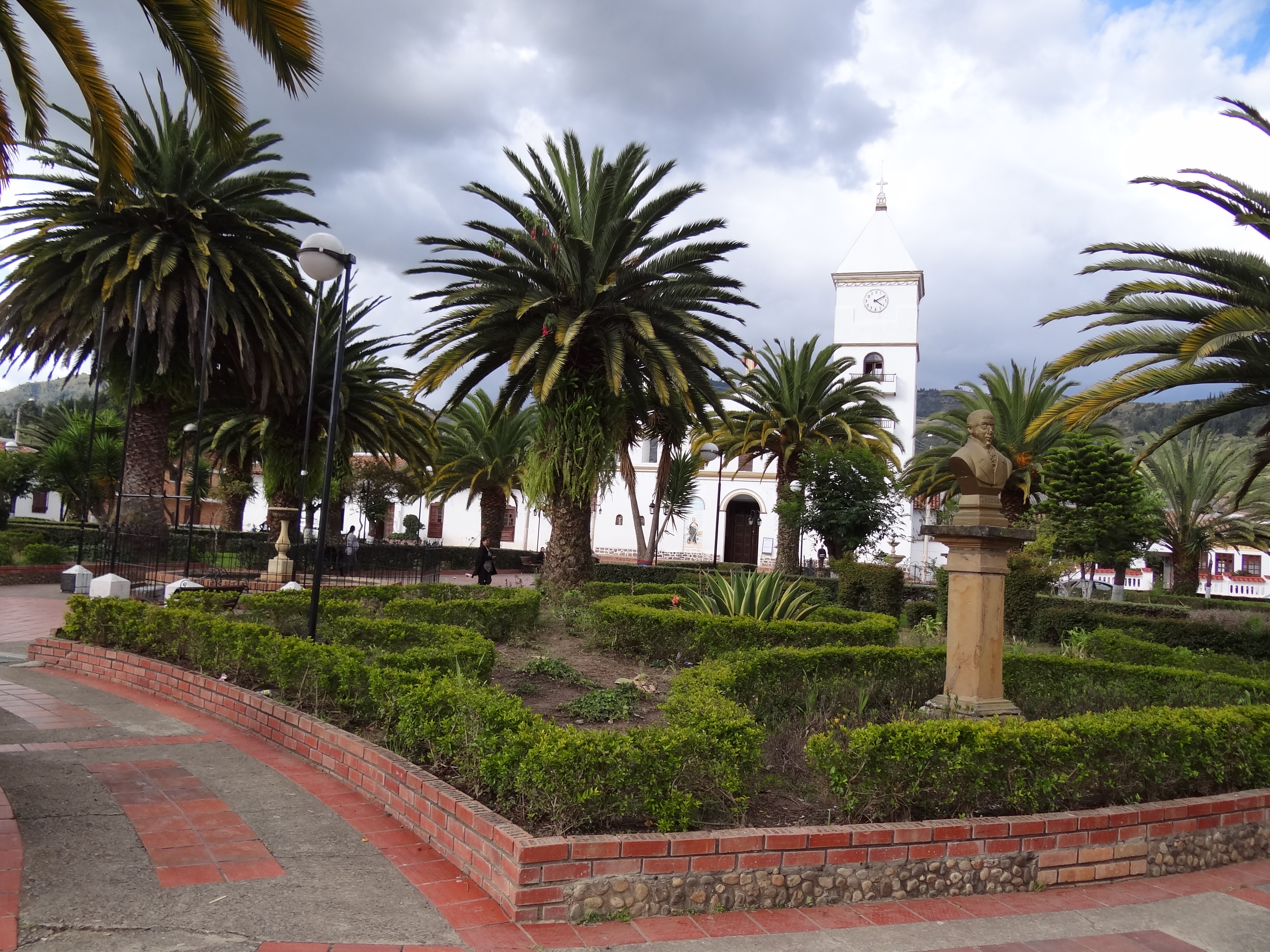
Central square

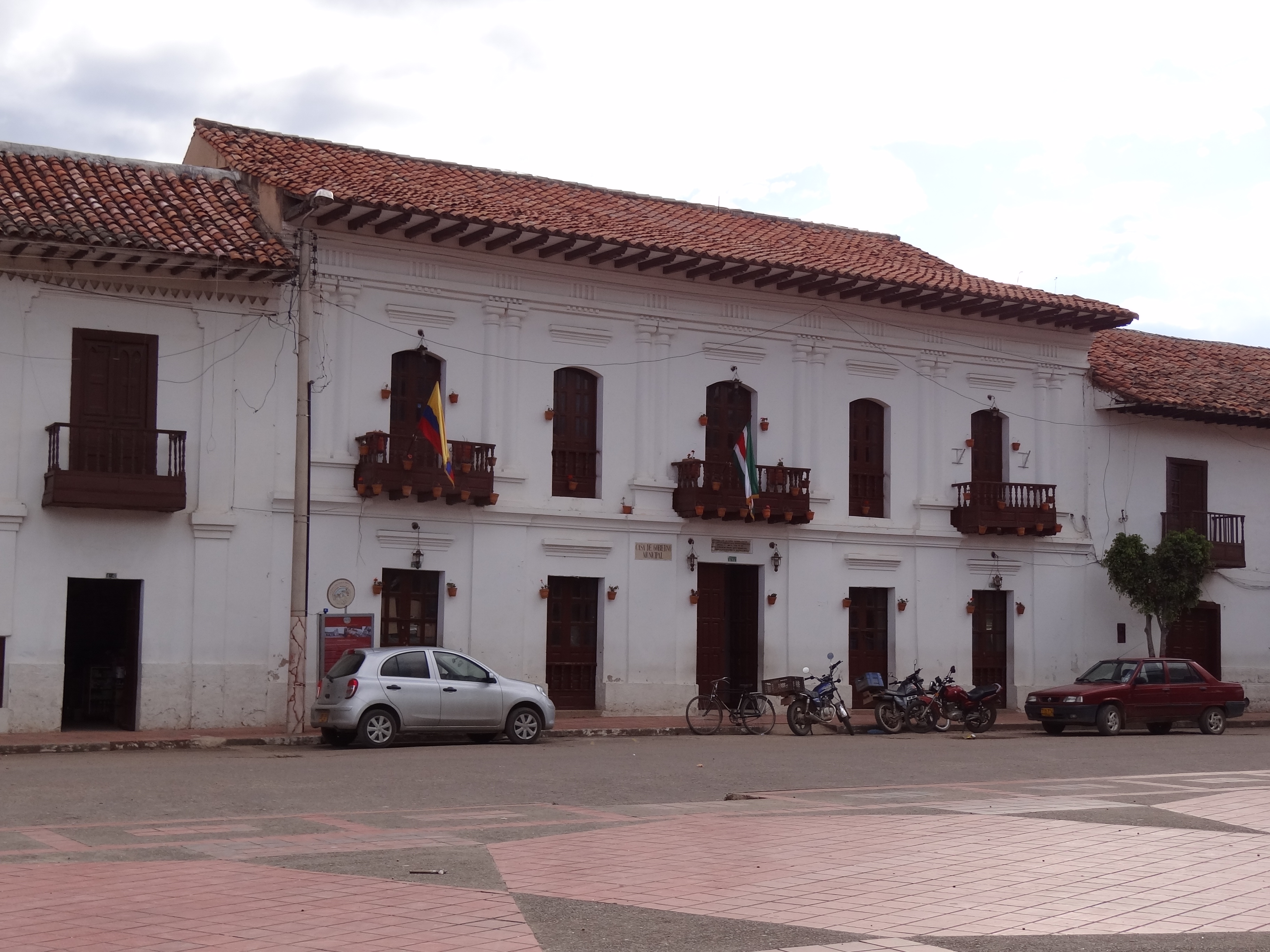
House in Floresta
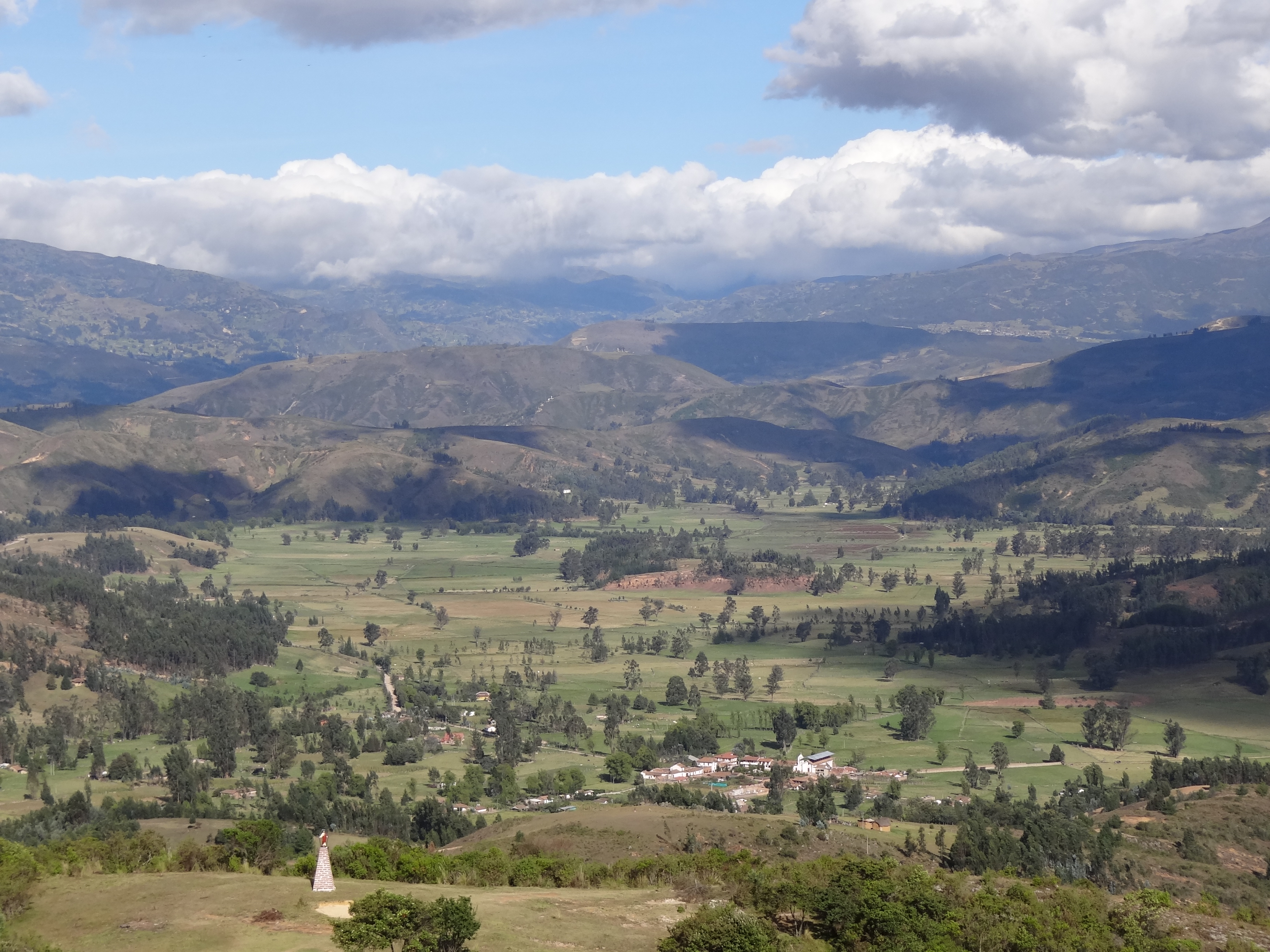
View of the valley of Floresta

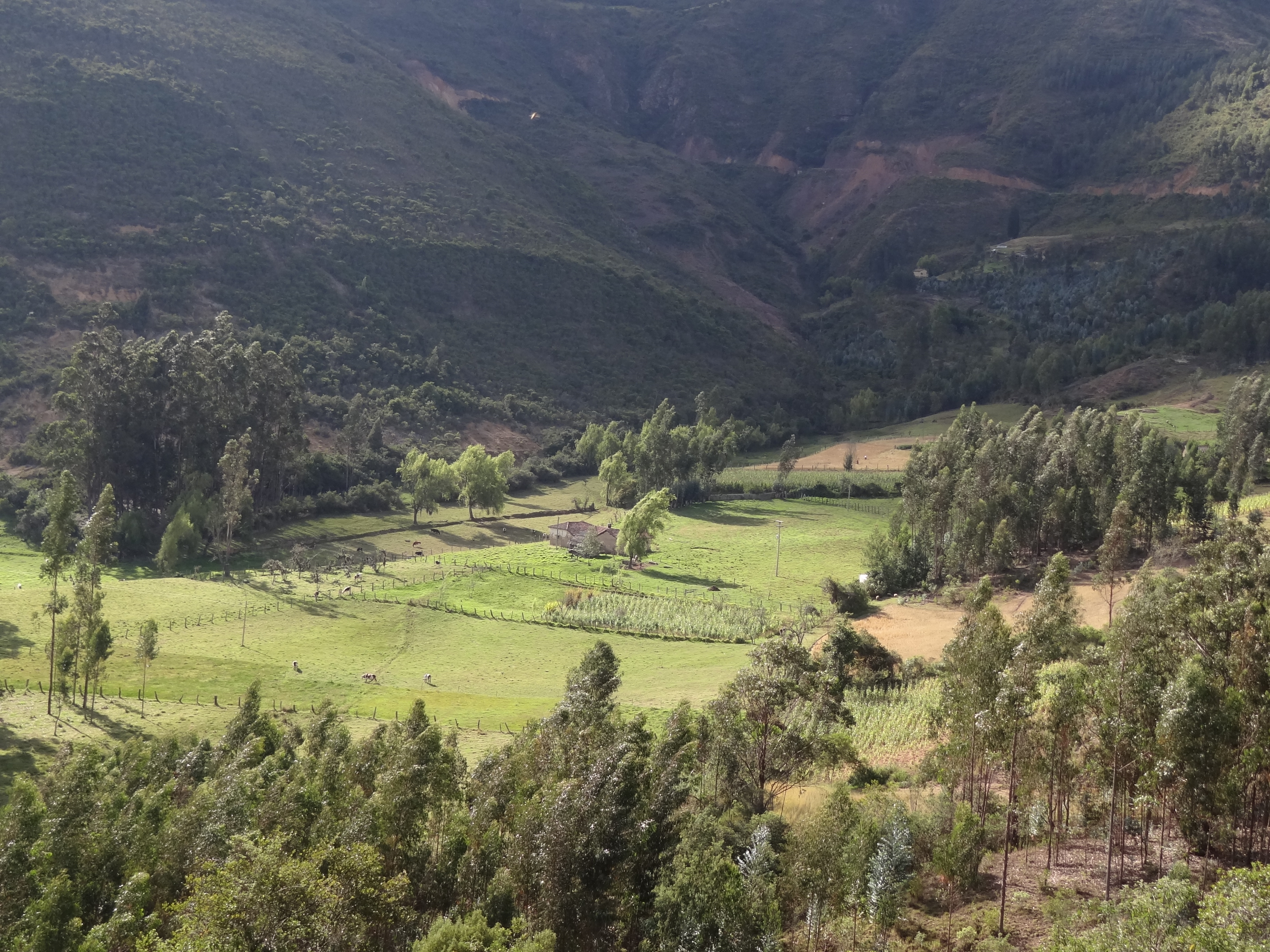
Rural area

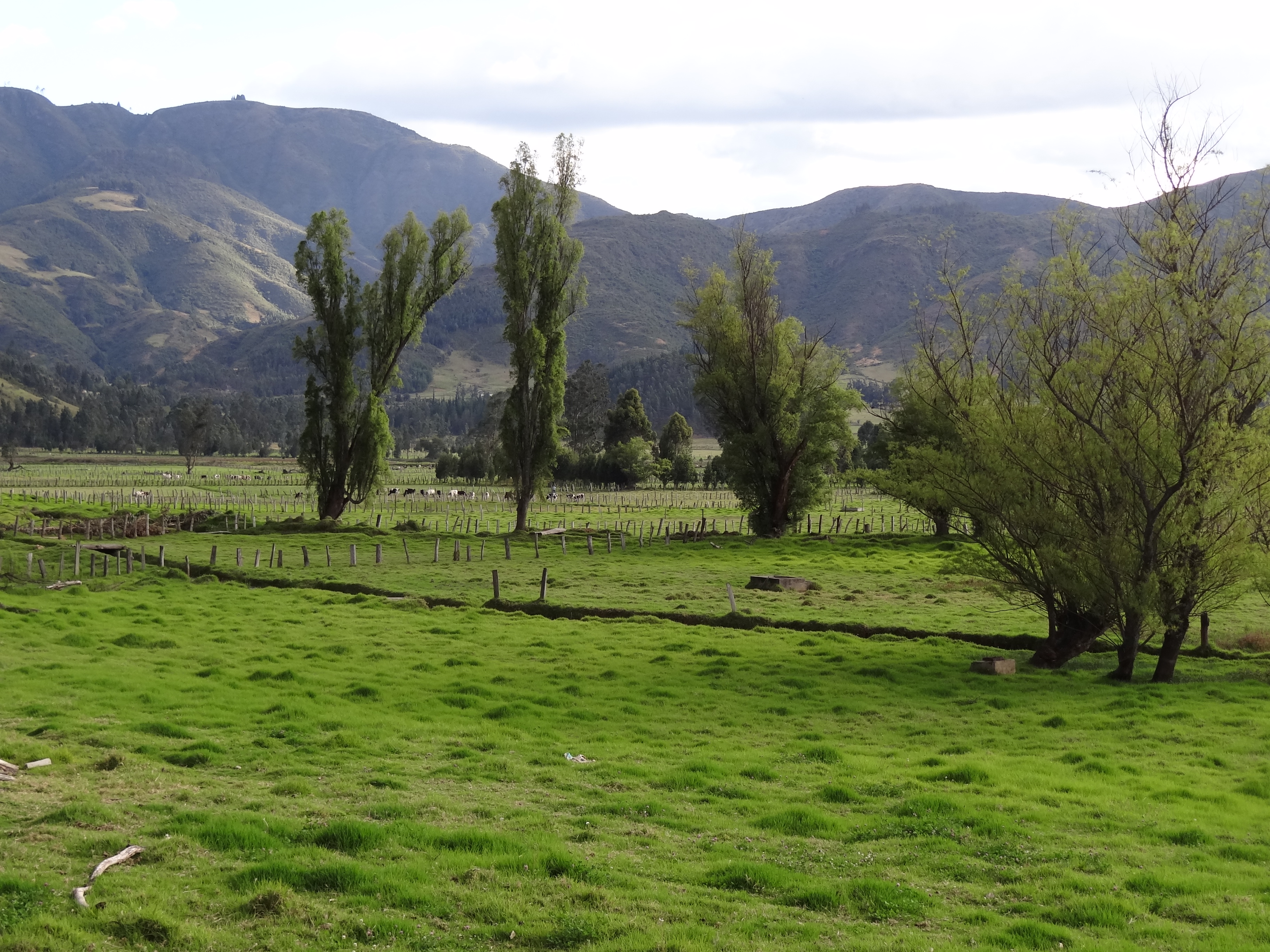
Rural area

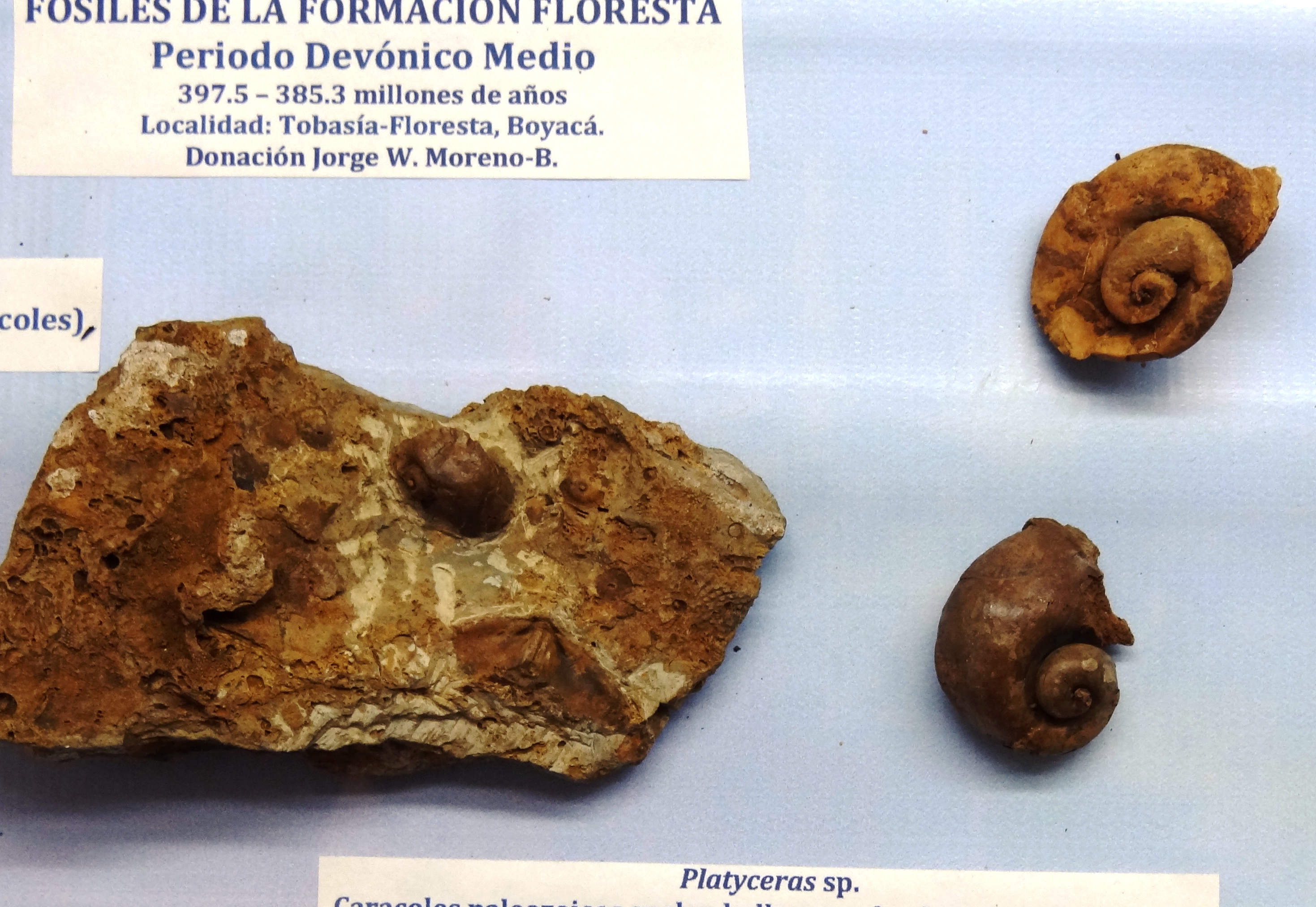
Fossils from Floresta
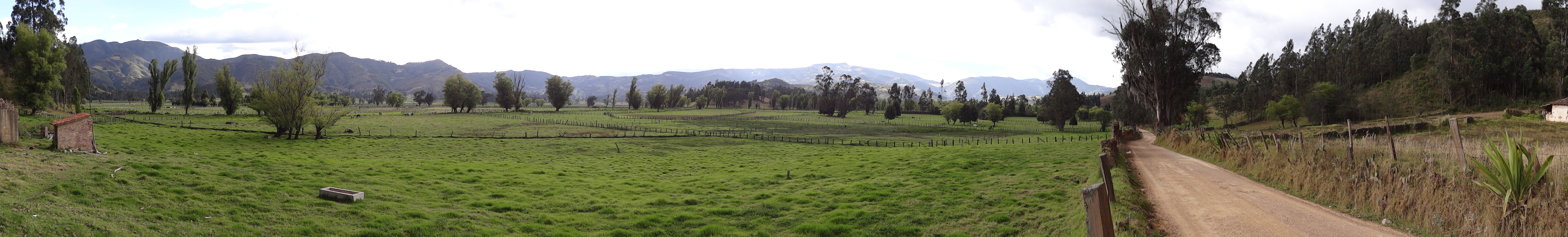
Rural part of Floresta
