= Santa Rosa de Viterbo, Boyacá =

Coordinates: 5°53′N 72°59′W

Santa Rosa de Viterbo
- Municipality and town
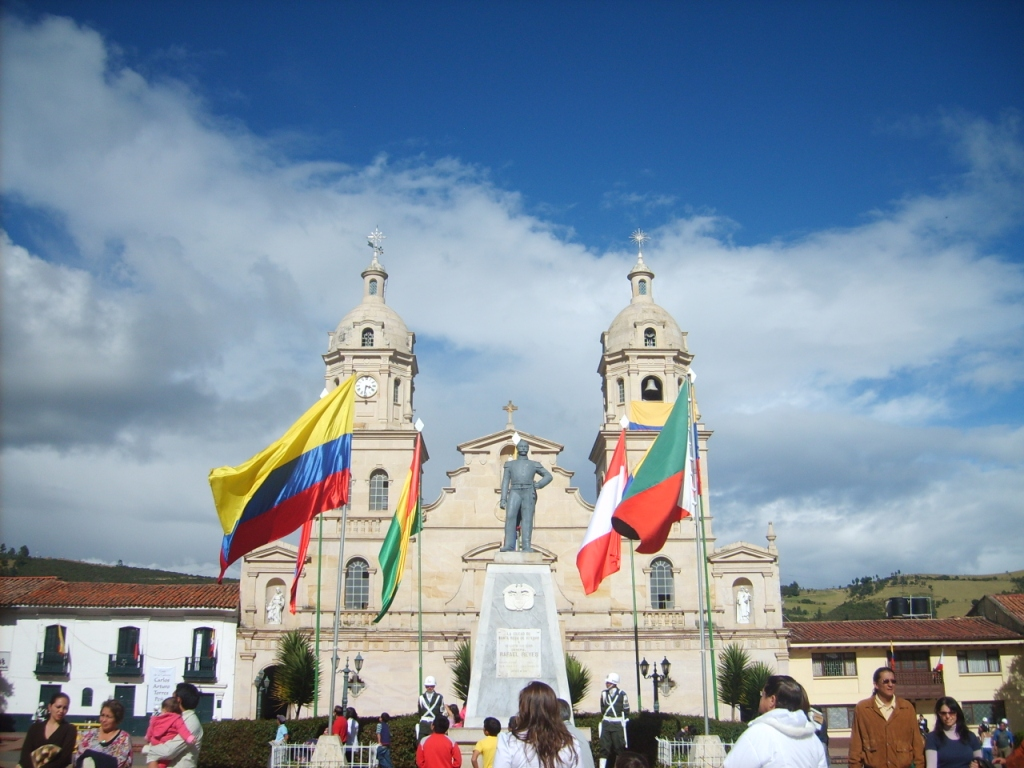
- Rafael Reyes Park.

- Flag Coat of arms

- Location of the municipality and town of Santa Rosa de Viterbo in the Boyacá Department of Colombia
- Country: Colombia
- Department: Boyacá Department
- Province: Tundama Province

Government
  - Mayor: Juan Alexis Martínez Fajardo (2024-2027)
- Elevation: 2,753 m (9,032 ft)

Population (2025)
  - Municipality and town: 13,468
  - Urban: 8,392
- Time zone: UTC-5 (Colombia Standard Time)

Santa Rosa de Viterbo is a town and municipality in Boyacá Department, Colombia, part of the Tundama Province, a subregion of Boyacá.

Viterbite, not a mineral but a mixture of allophane and wavellite, occurs in and was named after this municipality.

== History ==
According to the municipality's archived historical summary, Santa Rosa de Viterbo was founded on 19 May 1690. In 1905 it became the capital of the former Department of Tundama, and in 1908 it became the capital of the former Department of Santa Rosa.

== The "Aerolito" ==
Municipal historical records state that the aerolite was found near Tocavita in early 1810 by Cecilia Corredor, served for years as an anvil in a local blacksmith shop, and was installed on a stone column in the main square on 8 September 1877.

The National Museum of Colombia reports that Mariano Eduardo de Rivero and Jean-Baptiste Boussingault acquired it for the museum in 1823, and that the main mass reached the museum in 1906. The same source describes the Bogotá specimen as an ataxite, classified by the Smithsonian in 1940, composed primarily of iron and nickel, with a mass of 411 kg.

Municipal records indicate transfer to Bogotá during the presidency of Rafael Reyes in 1908. Radio Ambulante's archival reporting describes this transfer and the later dispersal of fragments to international collections, including Harvard University, the Smithsonian Institution, the Natural History Museum in London, and the Field Museum in Chicago. The Meteoritical Bulletin Database lists Santa Rosa as an iron meteorite (IC) with a total known weight of 825 kg.

== Demographics ==
DANE's 2025 municipal projections estimate 13,468 inhabitants in Santa Rosa de Viterbo (8,392 in the municipal seat and 5,076 in rural population centers).

== Institutions ==
The National Police's Escuela Rafael Reyes is located in Santa Rosa de Viterbo, Boyacá.

== Born in Santa Rosa de Viterbo ==
- Rafael Reyes, former president of Colombia
- Clímaco Calderón (1852-1913), acting president of Colombia.
- Carlos Arturo Torres Peña (1867-1911), writer, journalist, and diplomat.
- Jorge Rojas (1911-1995), poet and first director of Colcultura.
- Fernando Soto Aparicio (1933), screenwriter, poet, and novelist
- Juan José Reyes-Patria Escobar, Colombian politician and military leader
