= Belén, Boyacá =

Coordinates: 6°05′N 72°55′W

Belén
- Municipality and town
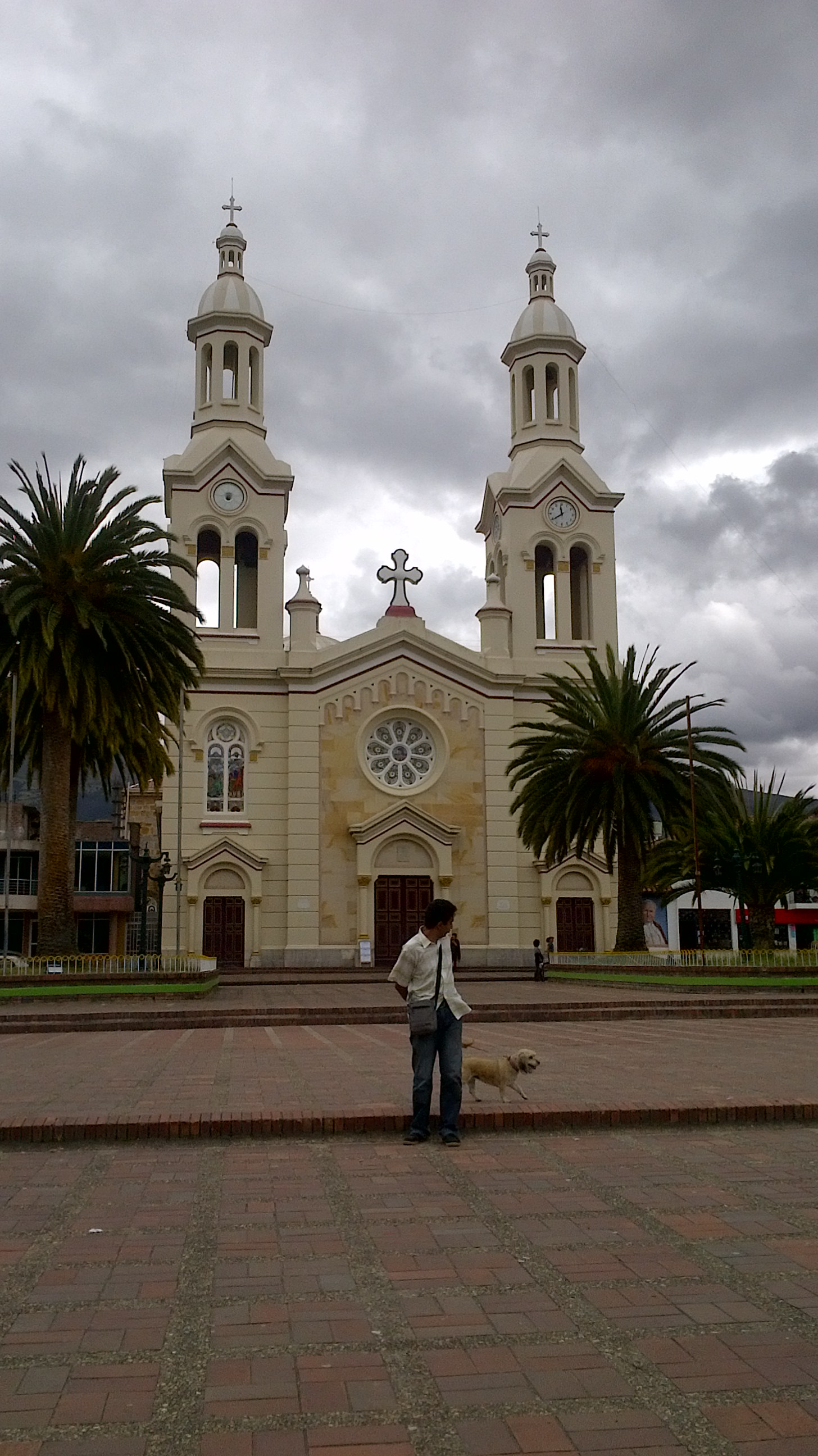

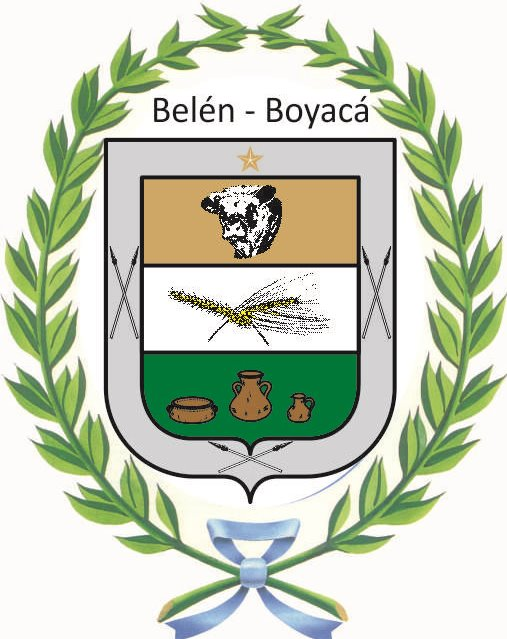
- Flag Coat of arms

- Location of the municipality and town of Belén in the Boyacá Department of Colombia
- Country: Colombia
- Department: Boyacá Department
- Province: Tundama Province

Government
  - Mayor: Oscar Eduardo Boada Castro (2020-2023)
- Time zone: UTC-5 (Colombia Standard Time)

Belén is a town and municipality in Boyacá Department, Colombia. Belen is also part of the Tundama Province a subregion of Boyaca.

== Born in Belén ==
- Eduardo Grimaldi, Colombian ecologist
