= Corrales, Boyacá =

- Municipality and town
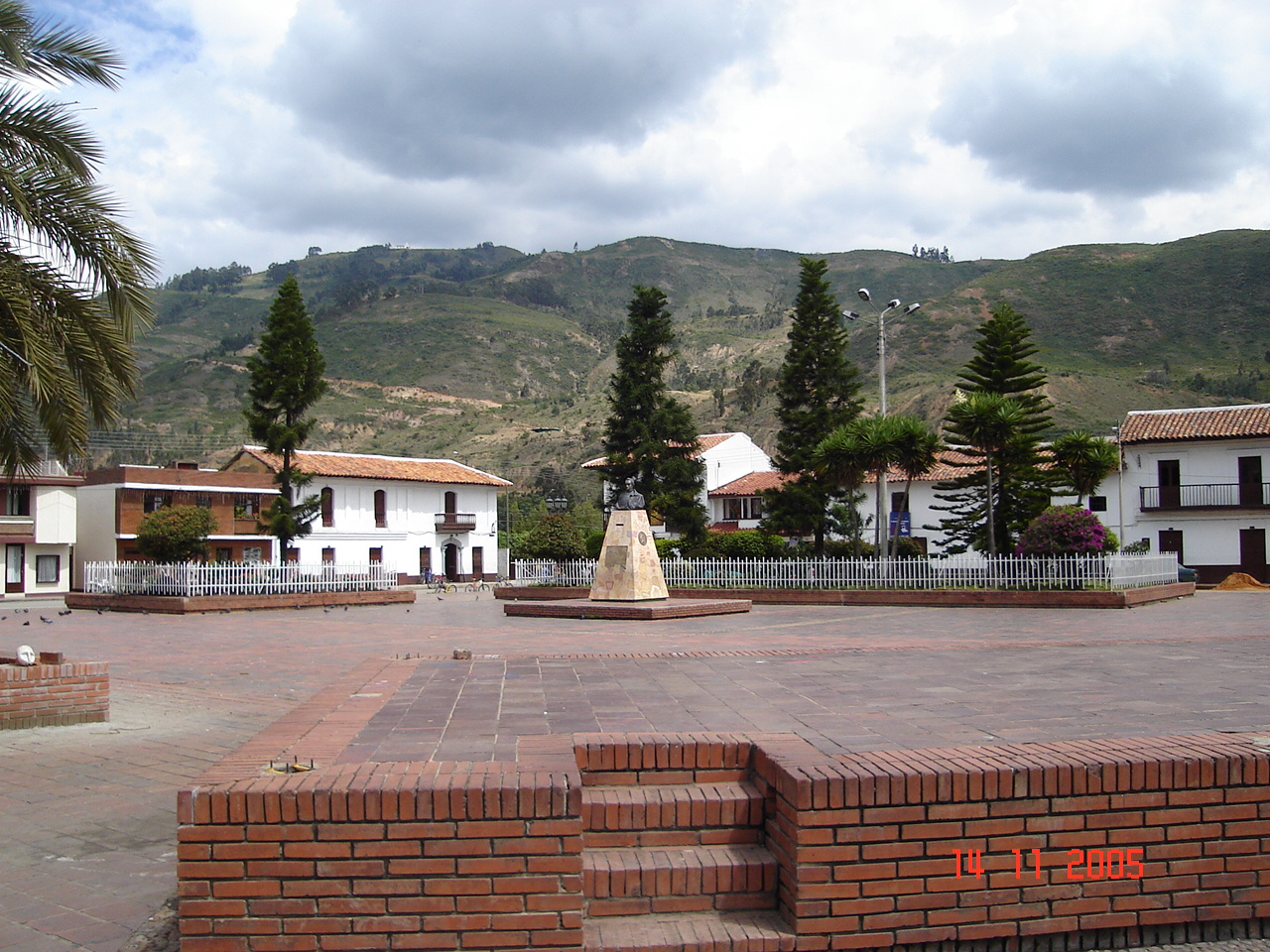

- Flag

- Location of the municipality and town of Corrales, Boyacá in the Boyacá Department of Colombia.
- Coordinates: 50°N 51°W
- Country: Colombia
- Department: Boyacá Department
- Province: Tundama Province

Government
  - Mayor: Pedro Antonio López Prieto (2020-2023)

Population
  - Total: 2,481
- Time zone: UTC-5 (Colombia Standard Time)
- Website: http://corrales-boyaca.gov.co

Corrales is municipality in the Tundama Province of the Colombian Department of Boyacá, with a population of 2,481 according to the 2005 Census.

== History ==
The locality was founded on January 28, 1782 by Vizente de Rivera y Mendoza. Three battles were fought there between 6 and 10 July 1819, during Bolívar's campaign to liberate New Granada.
