= Battle of Pasca =

c. 1470 Muisca battle in Colombia

Battle of Pasca (~1470)
- Part of Muisca Confederation wars
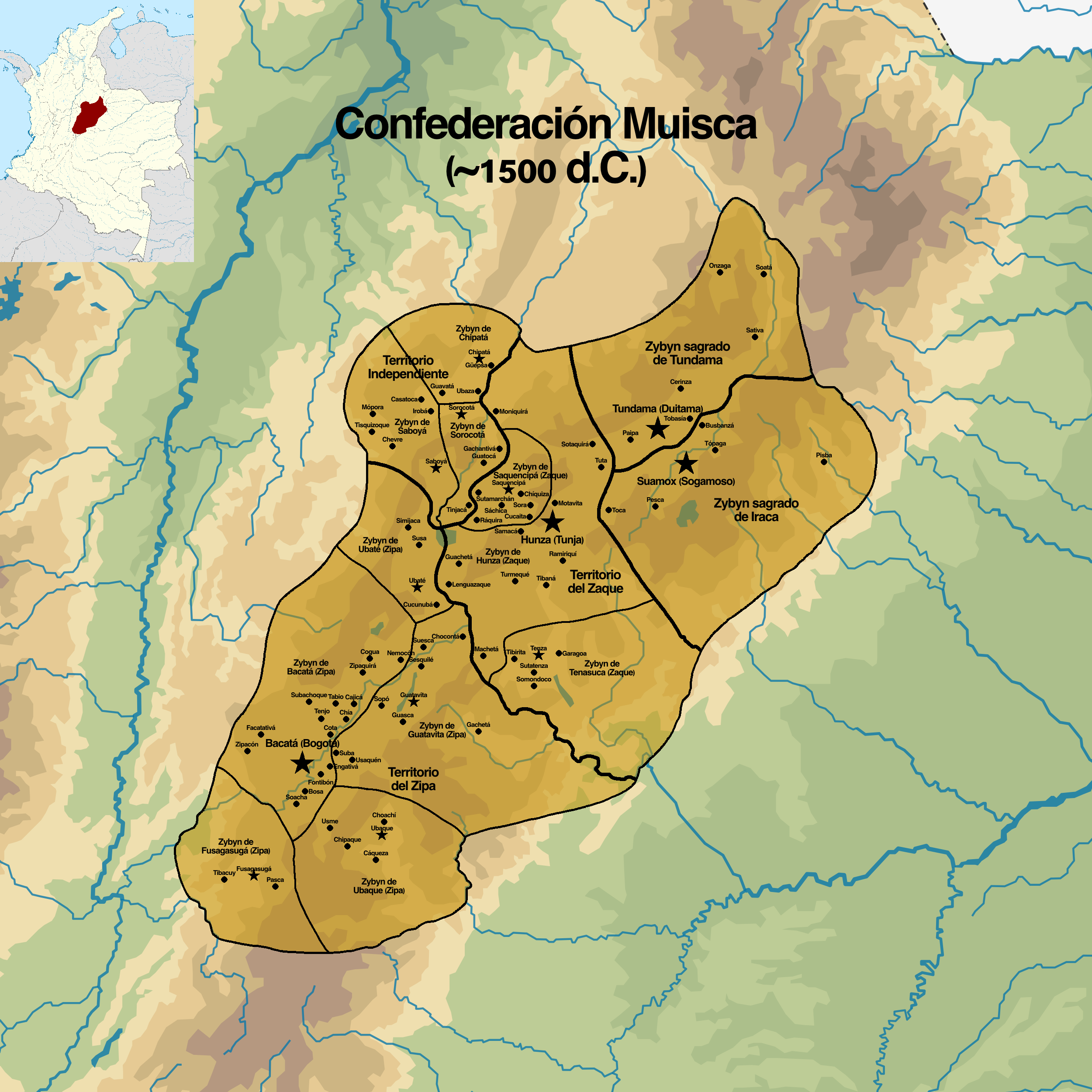
- Map of Muisca territories Pasca is located in the southwest of the zipa territory
| Location | Pasca, Muisca Confederation 4°18′27″N 74°18′03″W |
| Result | Zipazgo victory |
| Territorial changes | Sutagao submitted to Muisca rule |

Belligerents
| Zipazgo of the southern Muisca | Sutagao & Panche |

Commanders and leaders
| Saguamanchica | cacique of Fusagasugá |

Strength
| ~30,000 | Unknown |

Casualties and losses
| Unknown | Unknown |
- Location of the battle

The Battle of Pasca was fought between the southern Muisca Confederation, led by their zipa (ruler), Saguamanchica, and an alliance between the Panche and the Sutagao, led by the Cacique of Fusagasugá. The battle took place c. 1470 in the vicinity of Pasca, in modern-day Cundinamarca, Colombia, and resulted in a victory for Saguamanchica.

== Background ==
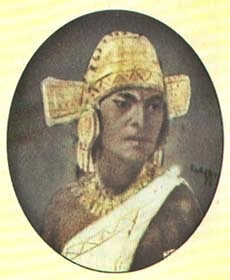
Saguamanchica

Before the Spanish conquest of the Muisca the central highlands of the Colombian Andes (the Altiplano Cundiboyacense) were inhabited by a number of indigenous groups. The most numerous were the Muisca, who lived in the central valleys of the eastern ranges. The leader of the southern Muisca at the time was the freshly installed Saguamanchica, successor to his uncle Meicuchuca. Their neighbours to the northwest were the Muzo; south of them were the Muisca's traditional enemy the Panche; occupying the southeastern part of present-day Cundinamarca were the Sutagao.

== Battle ==
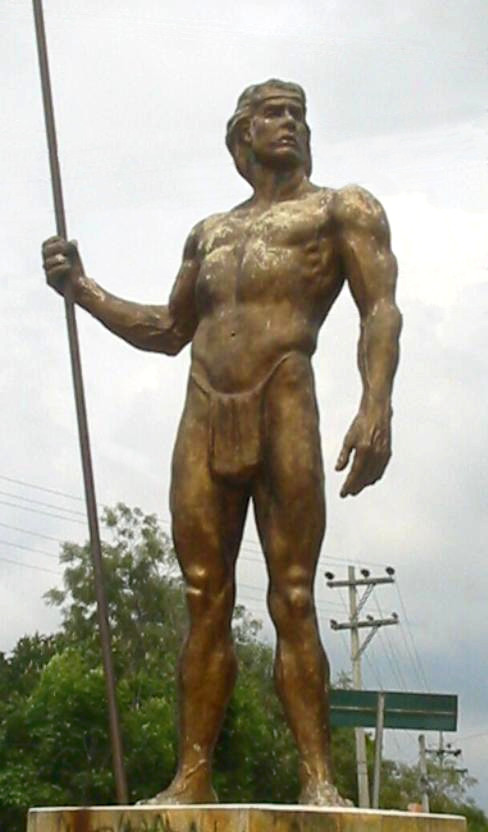
Sutagao warrior in Fusagasugá

Battle of Pasca and other battles around the Bogotá savanna

Shortly after taking power in 1470 Saguamanchica decided to attempt to conquer the Sutagao. He sent an advance force to reconnoiter the area and followed from Bacatá with an army of around 30,000 guecha warriors. The Sutagao hid in the hills around the Pasca River, together with a number of their Panche allies, but Saguamanchica brought them to battle. After a struggle lasting 12 hours the Muisca captured Uzatama, an important cacique (leader) of the Sutagao, causing the Sutagao and Panche to rout.

The Cacique of Tibacuy then negotiated the submission of the Sutagao to Saguamanchica.

== Aftermath ==
Some twenty years later Saguamanchica fought another major battle; this time against the northern Muisca led by Zaque Michuá: the Battle of Chocontá. Both Muisca rulers died in this battle.

History of the Muisca
| Altiplano | Muisca | Art | Architecture | Astronomy | Cuisine | El Dorado | Subsistence | Women | Conquest |

== See also ==
- Muisca warfare, history of Colombia, Battle of Tocarema
- Muisca rulers, Battle of Chocontá

== Bibliography ==
- Fernández de Piedrahita, Lucas (1688), Historia general de las conquistas del Nuevo Reino de Granada (in Spanish)
