= Battle of Chocontá =

c. 1490 Muisca battle in Colombia

Battle of Chocontá (~1490)
- Part of Muisca Confederation wars
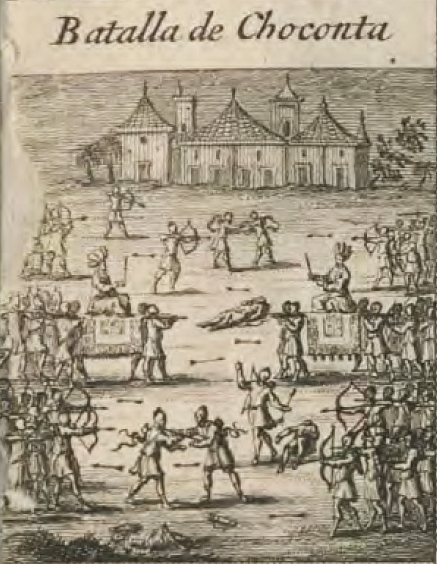
- Battle of Chocontá by Lucas de Piedrahita (1676)
Location	Chocontá, Muisca Confederation 5°09′N 73°41′W
Result	Zipazgo of the southern victory

Belligerents
Zipazgo of the southern Muisca	Zacazgo of the northern Muisca

Commanders and leaders
Saguamanchica †	Michuá † cacique of Guatavita

Strength
~50,000	~60,000

Casualties and losses
Unknown	Unknown
- Location of the battle

The Battle of Chocontá was one of a series of battles in the ongoing conflict between the northern and southern Muisca of pre-Columbian central Colombia. The battle was fought c. 1490 in the vicinity of Chocontá. An army of 50,000 southern Muisca guecha warriors, led by their ruler, or zipa, Saguamanchica, attacked 60,000 northern Muisca troops commanded by Zaque Michuá, who was supported by the Cacique of Guatavita.

== Background ==
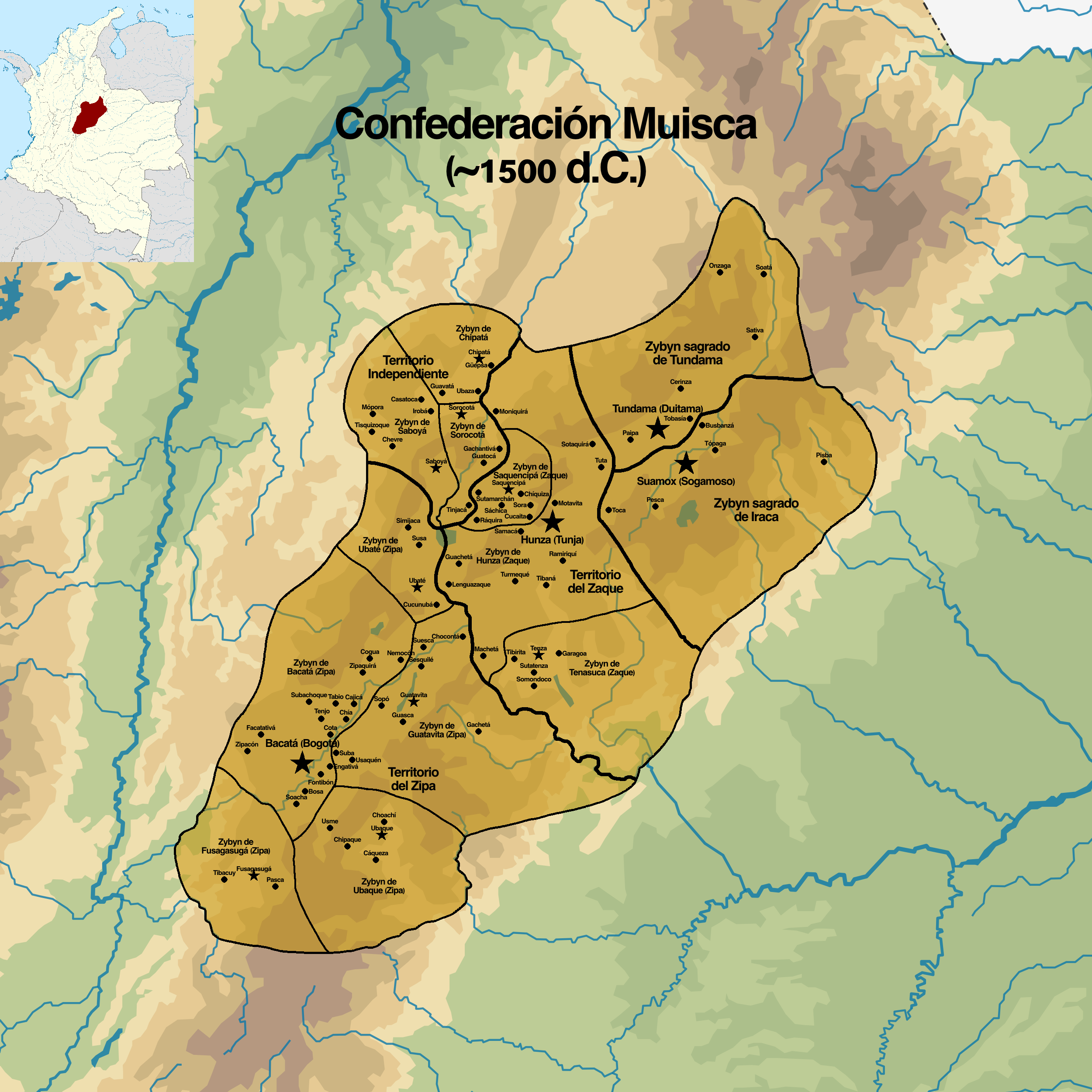
Map of Muisca territories Chocontá is located on the border of the zipa

In the decades before the Spanish conquistadors arrived in the central highlands of Colombia in 1537, the area was ruled by two main groups: the zacazgo of the northern Muisca and the zipazgo of the southern Muisca. While the two factions were joined in a confederation, they fought numerous wars to conquer terrain and to gain access to the resources of the area, mainly gold, copper, and emeralds.

The northern Muisca inhabited the area of the current department of Boyacá while the southern Muisca lived in the present-day Cundinamarca Department. The capital of the zaque was Hunza, today known as Tunja, and the zipa resided in Bacatá, the later Colombian capital Bogotá.

== Battle ==
Battle of Chocontá and other battles around the Bogotá savanna

The invading southern guecha warriors of Saguamanchica gathered near Chocontá to face the Michuá. The battle lasted three hours and was recorded as being exceptionally bloody. The leaders of both armies were killed during the battle. The zipazgo of the southern Muisca was victorious. Quemuenchatocha became the new zaque of Hunza and the zipa of Bacatá was succeeded by Nemequene.

The battle was one of the first Muisca acts of war documented by the bishop and chronicler Lucas Fernández de Piedrahita.

=== Battle of Chocontá in Muisca history ===
History of the Muisca
Altiplano	Muisca	Art	Architecture	Astronomy	Cuisine	El Dorado	Subsistence	Women	Conquest

== See also ==
- Muisca warfare, history of Colombia, Battle of Tocarema
- Muisca rulers, Battle of Pasca
