= Muisca warfare =

Military history of Colombia

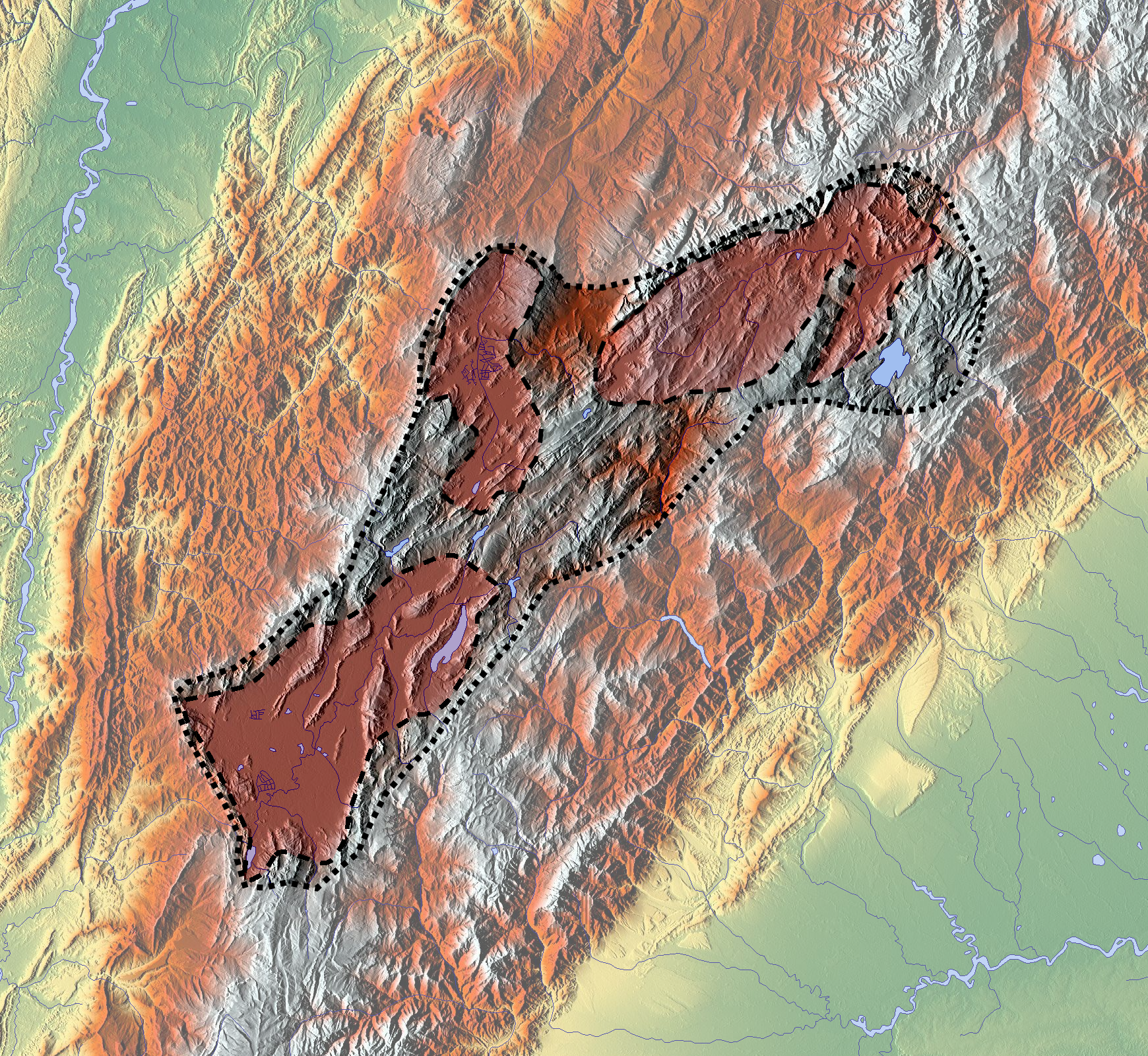
The Altiplano Cundiboyacense, deep in the Colombian Andes, was the region where the Muisca established a loose confederation composed of small settlements. Their total population is estimated between 300,000 and two million people

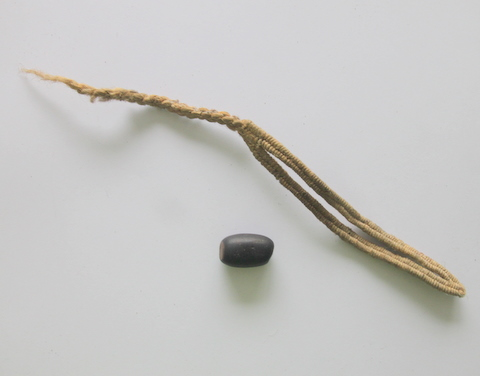
Slings of woven cotton with stones were used by the guecha warriors in battle

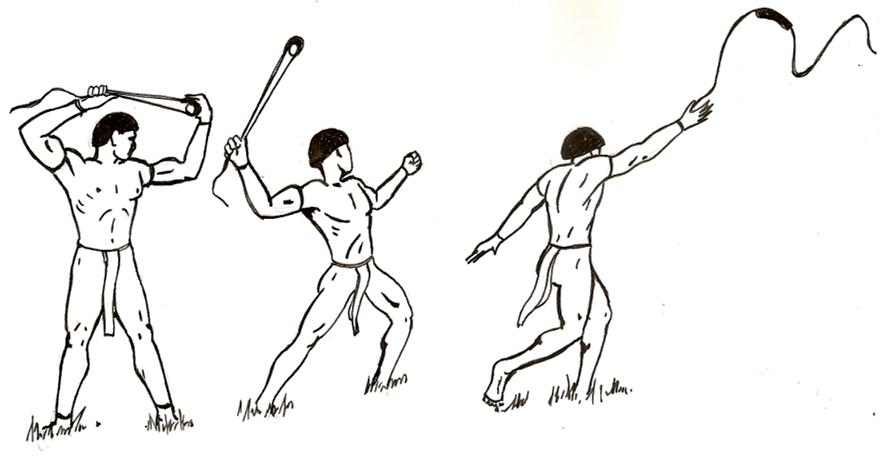
The warriors threw their stones with slings when hunting or battling

This article describes the warfare of the Muisca. The Muisca inhabited the Tenza and Ubaque valleys and the Altiplano Cundiboyacense, the high plateau of the Colombian Eastern Ranges of the Andes in the time before the Spanish conquest. Their society was mainly egalitarian with little difference between the elite class (caciques) and the general people. The Muisca economy was based on agriculture and trading raw materials like cotton, coca, feathers, sea snails and gold with their neighbours. Called "Salt People", they extracted salt from brines in Zipaquirá, Nemocón and Tausa to use for their cuisine and as trading material.

Being mostly traders and farmers, the Muisca also had a structure of combatants, called guecha warriors. Between the northern and southern parts of the Muisca Confederation, battles were fought where the zipa, ruling over the Bogotá savanna in the south and the zaque of Hunza in the north contested for control over terrains. The leaders of the communities fought with their warriors. The main enemy of the Muisca were the Panche people who inhabited the area to the west of the Altiplano in the hills leading to the Magdalena River. Fortifications of guecha warriors, a privileged class in their society, were built in the border region with the Panche. The guecha warriors were armed with blowpipes, spears, clubs, and slings; and defended themselves with long shields and thick multi-layered cotton mantles. Battles in the history of the Muisca are described around Chocontá (~1490) and Pasca around 1470. When the Spanish conquistadors entered the Muisca Confederation in March 1537 after a long, deadly and sterunous expedition from Santa Marta at the Caribbean coast, they found little resistance of the Muisca, except in later battles against the Tundama ruling over the northernmost area around Duitama. The Spanish who already had conquered the Muisca and founded Bogotá, used the guecha warriors to submit the Panche in the Battle of Tocarema on August 20, 1538.

Knowledge about the Muisca warfare has been provided by the conquistadors who made first contact with the Muisca; Gonzalo Jiménez de Quesada, his brother Hernán, Juan de San Martín and Antonio de Lebrija. Later scholars were Juan de Castellanos, Pedro Simón and Lucas Fernández de Piedrahita. Modern anthropological research has revised some of the accounts of the early chroniclers on the war-like status of the Muisca, who were even by the conquistadors considered more traders and negotiators than fighters.

== Background ==
In the ages before the Spanish conquest of the Muisca, the high central plains of the Eastern Ranges of the Colombian Andes was inhabited by the Muisca. They established a rather egalitarian society of small settlements dotted across the valleys and flatlands in the mountains, based mainly on agriculture, trade and the extraction of salt, which gave them the name "The Salt People". The Altiplano Cundiboyacense and neighbouring Ubaque and Tenza Valleys to the east the inhabited was very much isolated from the coast of later Colombia, but via trade routes and many markets held frequently, they were connected with their neighbouring indigenous groups; to the west and northwest the Panche, Muzo and Yarigui people, to the north the Guane, Lache and U'wa, in the eastern part towards the vast flatlands of the Llanos Orientales the Achagua, Guayupe and Tegua people and to the south in the mountains of Sumapaz the Sutagao.

The Muisca spoke Chibcha, or in their own language called Muysccubun; "language of the people", and traded with their neighbours raw products to establish a self-sufficient economy where surpluses were traded for cotton, gold, emeralds, feathers, bee wax (for the fine goldworking of their tunjo offer pieces) and tropical fruits not growing on the high plains. The people were very religious and honoured their two main deities Sué, the Sun, and Chía, his wife; the Moon in their Sun and Moon temples in Sugamuxi and Chía respectively. Each small settlement of maximum 100 bohíos was headed by a cacique and the major towns of Bacatá and Hunza were ruled by the zipa and zaque. The Sacred City of the Sun Sugamuxi was ruled by a priest, called iraca and the northernmost area headed by the Tundama based in the hills around the former lake of Duitama.

The initiation ritual of the new zipa took place in their sacred Lake Guatavita where he would cover himself in gold dust and jump from a raft in the waters of the circular lake at 3,000 metres (9,800 ft) altitude, a ritual represented in the famous Muisca raft. It was this "Man of Gold" that formed the basis for the myth of El Dorado, known far outside of the Muisca Confederation, as their loose collection of rulers was called. This legend formed the main goal for the Spanish conquest that took the conquistadors more than a year into the Andes, from Santa Marta, where they left in early April 1536.

== Description ==
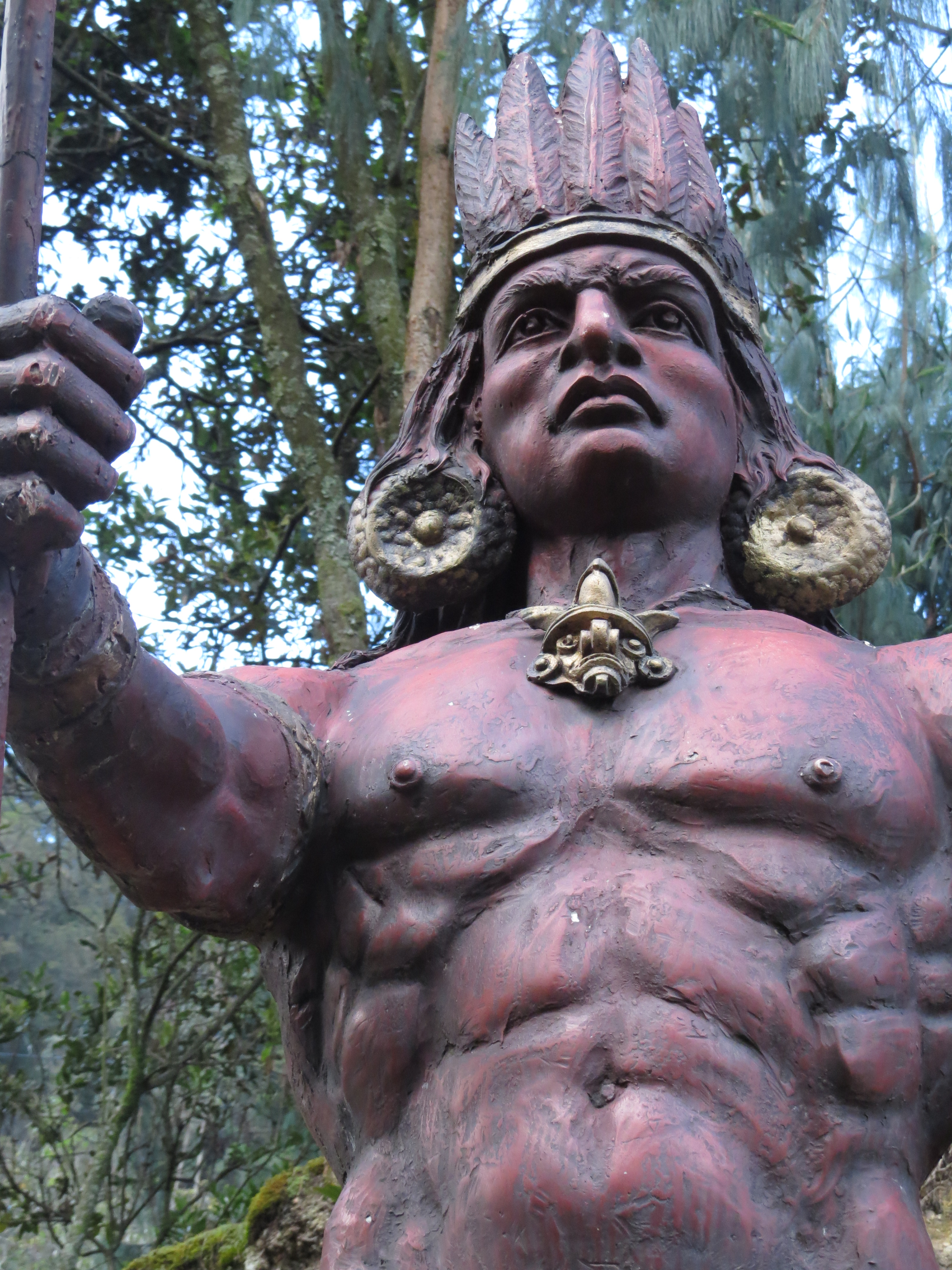
Other than the general people, the guecha warriors were allowed to wear feathered crowns and golden jewels

Although early descriptions by Spanish chroniclers narrate about warfare, later revision of earlier beliefs has revealed that the Muisca were more a community of traders than warriors. Still, all researchers agree that the Muisca people had special classes in their society reserved for their warriors and that battles were fought mainly defending their terrain against the Panche in the west and southwest and between each other; the battles between the zipa and zaque. The Chibcha word for "war" or "enemy" is saba.

=== Guecha warriors ===
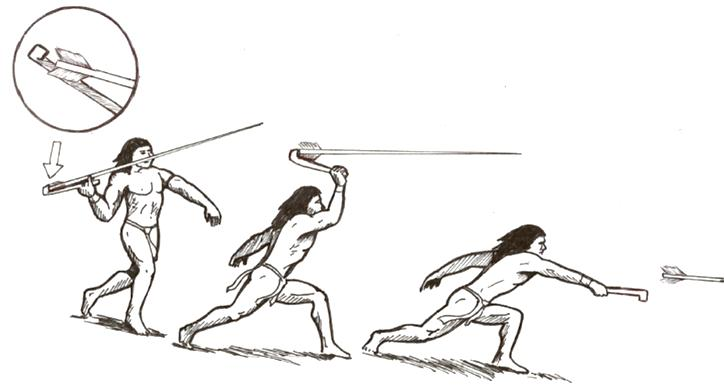
To throw their arrows, the Muisca warriors used slings similar to the atlatl of Mesoamerica

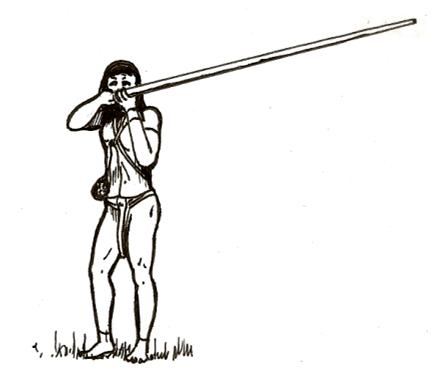
Poisoned darts were shot using blowpipes

For the etymology of the word güecha various hypotheses have been presented. According to Pedro Simón, guecha meant "brave", while Ezequiel Uricoechea signals its derivation from zuecha, meaning "uncle"; "brother of the mother". The lineage of heritage in the Muisca society was maternal. Uricoechea described the term as a combination of gue- ("village") and cha, which means "man" or "male"; "man of the village". The name guecha has been changed in modern Colombian Spanish as guache, meaning "uncivilised", "brute".

The guecha warriors enjoyed special privileges and were considered a higher class of the society. They ranked below the priests, but above the general people. Both Pedro Simón and Lucas Fernández de Piedrahita describe the guecha warriors as strong and brave men, recruited from the people in the various villages of the Muisca Confederation. They went through years of training in combat before being assigned as guecha warrior. Their appearance was different from the other people, of which the men had long hair. To be more efficient and safer in battle, the guecha warriors cut their hair short. While jewellery was not common among the general people, and after installation of the Code of Nemequene even prohibited, the guecha warriors wore jewels such as golden or tumbaga nose pieces, pectorals, earrings and crowns with coloured feathers. The amount of earrings would indicate the number of enemies beaten. Their bodies were painted using inks from the Genipa americana tree.

=== Weapons and defense ===
For their battles, and for hunting, the warriors used clubs, poisoned darts with blowpipes, spears and slings, similar to the atlatl of Mesoamerica. The bows and arrows were not produced by the Muisca themselves, but taken from conquered Panche slaves. To defend themselves from the poisoned arrows the Panche used, the guecha warriors covered themselves with multiple layers of cotton mantles. To protect themselves, they use long shields.

=== Fortifications ===
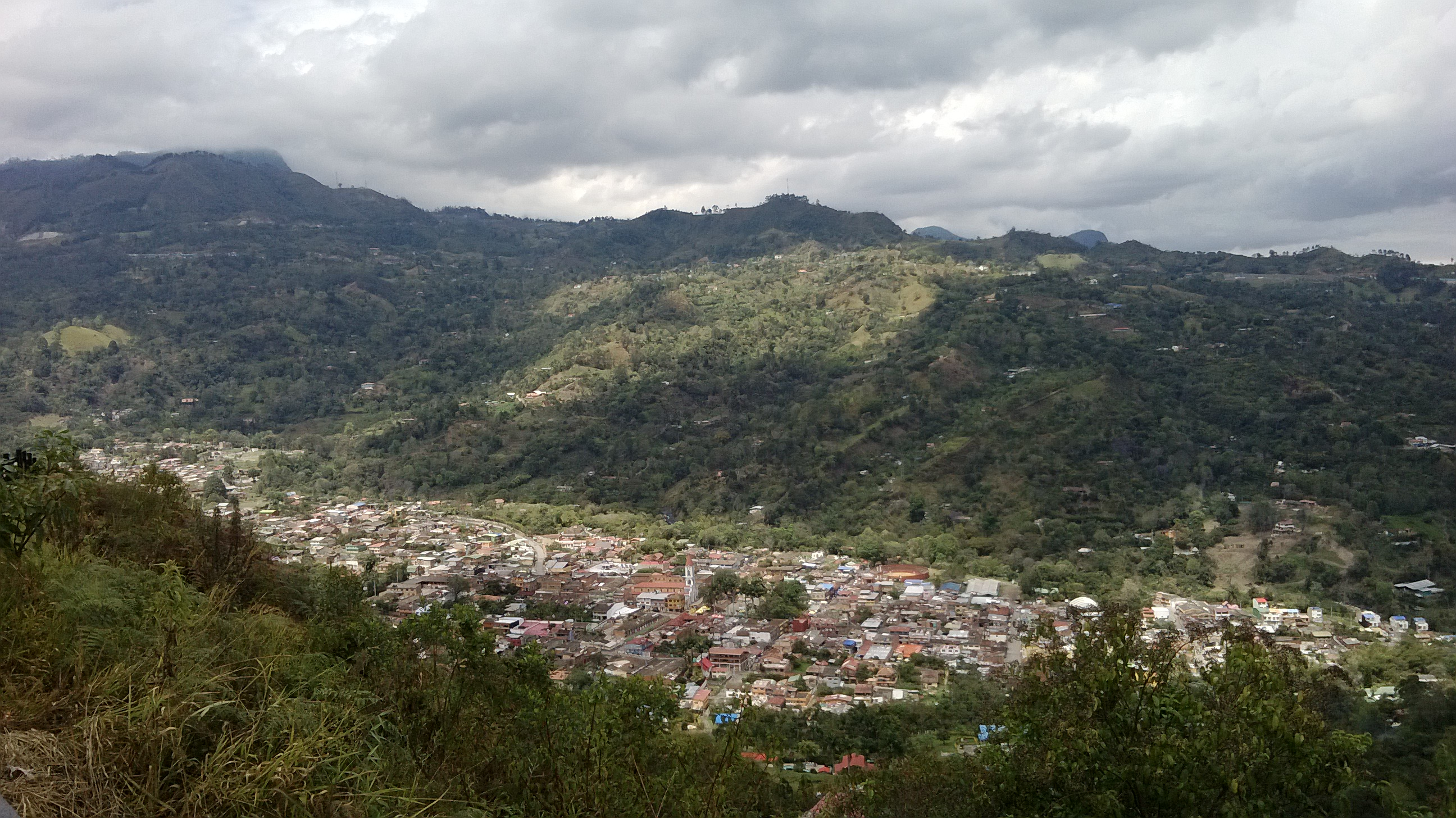
San Francisco, in the time of the Muisca called Chinga, was one of the locations where the guecha warriors defended the Confederation against the attacks by the Panche

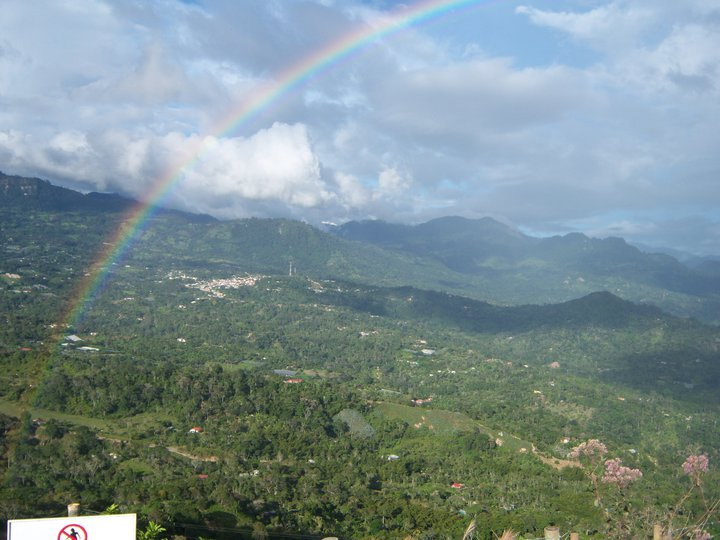
Tocarema, present-day Cachipay, here guarded by rainbow god Cuchavira, was the site of the Battle of Tocarema on August 20, 1538, between an alliance of the Spanish with the last Muisca zipa Sagipa and the Panche people

At the borders of the Muisca territories, the leaders organised fortifications of guecha warriors to defend their terrain. Although on the presence of a stone fortress in Cajicá there is serious doubt if it existed in pre-conquest times, fortifications around the Confederation have been described.

Settlement	Department	Neighbour(s)	Altitude (m) urban centre	Map
San Francisco	Cundinamarca	Panche	1520	
Anolaima	Cundinamarca	Panche	1657	
San Antonio del Tequendama	Cundinamarca	Panche	1540	
Tena	Cundinamarca	Panche	1384	
Tibacuy	Cundinamarca	Panche, Sutagao	1647	
Silvania	Cundinamarca	Sutagao	1470	
Fosca	Cundinamarca	Guayupe	2080	
Chocontá	Cundinamarca	between zipa and zaque	2655	
Turmequé	Boyacá	between zipa and zaque	2389	

=== Battles ===
Battle locations around the Bogotá savanna

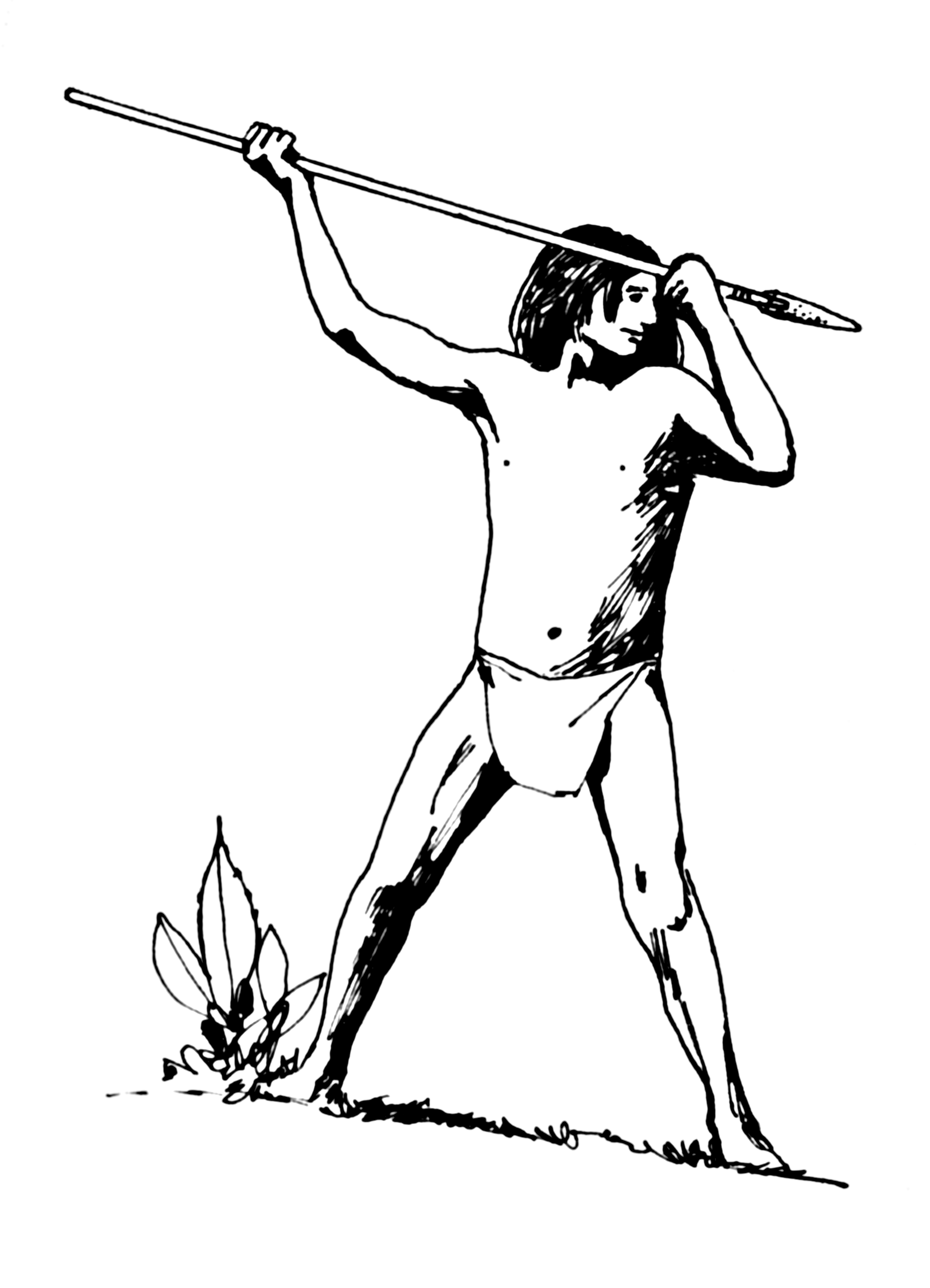
Spears were used by the Muisca for hunting and fishing and in battle

While some later scholars have described the Muisca as battling people, the conquistadors who made first contact with them tell a different story. Conquistadors Juan de San Martín, Antonio de Lebrija and leader and writer Gonzalo Jiménez de Quesada have said they were:

...gente que quiere paz y no guerra, porque aunque son muchos, son de pocas armas y no ofensivas

...people who want peace and not war, because although they are many, their arms are few and not offensive

The battles that were fought, were mostly against the Panche to the west, who have been described by the first conquistadors as belligerent and cannibalistic. Pedro Simón interpreted their name, the word panche as meaning "cruel" and "murderer". Between the two main parts of the Muisca Confederation; the zipa and the zaque two main battles have been described, the first happening around 1470 in Pasca. During battles, the warriors wore the mummies of ancestors on their backs to impress their enemies. Battles were fought according to the Muisca calendar, a complex luni-solar calendar the people used to indicate different types of years and months.

==== Muisca Confederation ====
Two main battles, one between the northern and southern Muisca and one with the southern neighbours, the Sutagao, have been described by the chroniclers, mainly De Piedrahita. The first battle was around the year 1470 in Pasca between the zipa of Bacatá Saguamanchica, leading an army of around 30,000 guecha warriors, and the cacique of the Sutagao, resulting in a victory of the first and the inclusion of the southern region into the Muisca Confederation.

The second battle, some twenty years later, took place around Chocontá in the north of the Bogotá savanna between the zipa and the zaque. Here again, Saguamanchica defeated his stronger enemy Michuá of around 60,000 warriors in a three-hour fight. Both leaders died because of the bloody battle.

==== Spanish conquest ====
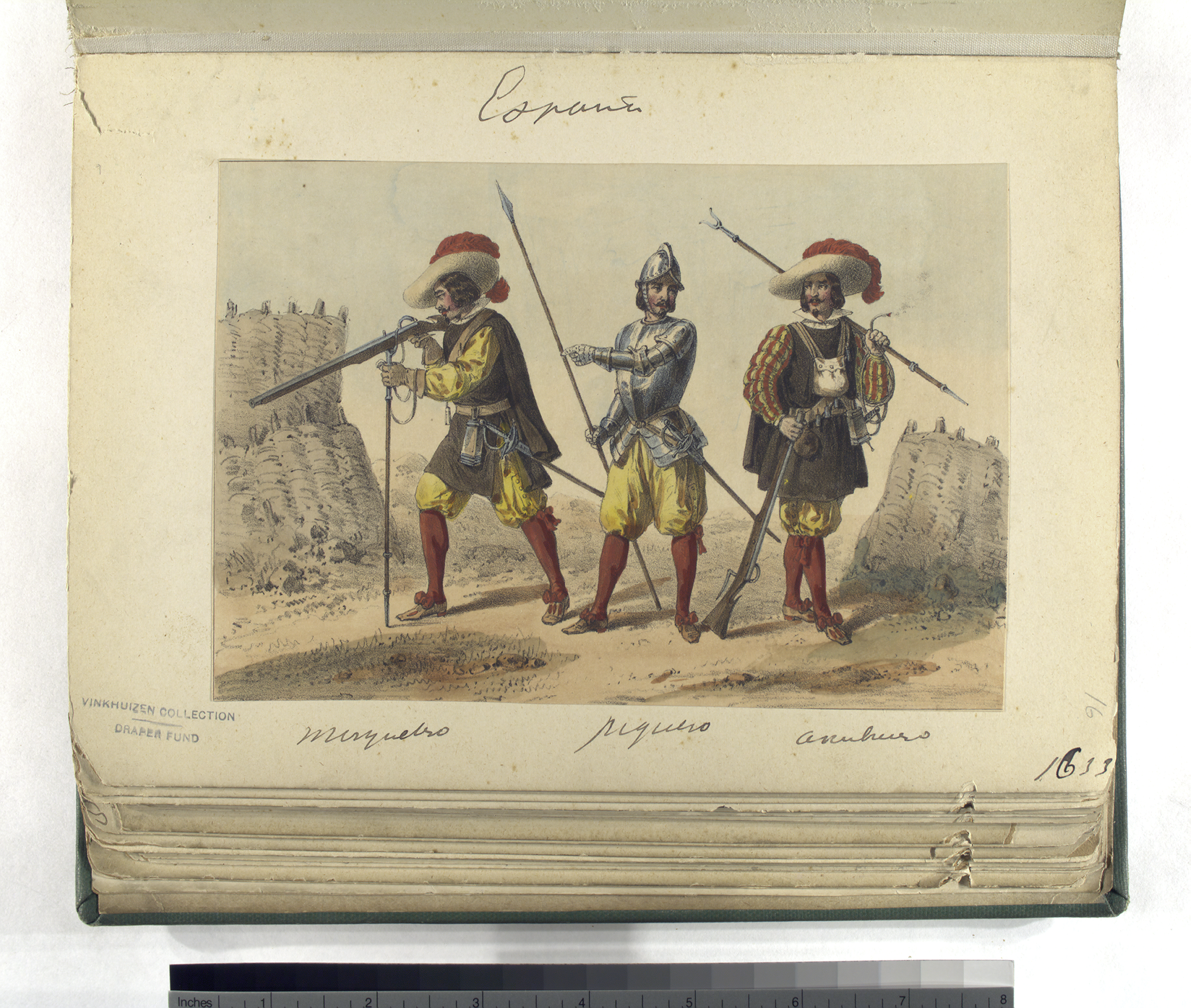
The "thunder sticks" of the Spanish conquistadors scared the Muisca people and they considered them supernatural

When the Spanish conquistadors entered the terrains of the Muisca in March 1537, when they founded Chipatá, they first found little resistance in the northern parts. Crossing Boyacá in the narrow part, they entered the Bogotá savanna where in Nemocón, an important salt-producing settlement, they encountered the first resistance. The narratives of the exhausted conquerors talk about attacks of hundreds of warriors against the greatly reduced troops of De Quesada, which the Spanish fought off. Most of the time, the Muisca, excellent traders, tried to negotiate with the Spanish invasors to stop them from using their "thunder sticks"; weaponry unknown among and feared by the Muisca. Shortly after the Muisca Confederation was conquered and the capital of the New Kingdom of Granada, Santafé de Bogotá was founded in August 1538, the conquistadors used the eternal conflicts of the Muisca with the Panche to ally with zipa Sagipa and fight the Panche with only 50 Spanish soldiers and 12,000 to 20,000 guecha warriors in the Battle of Tocarema on August 20, 1538.

== See also ==
- Conquistadors in Colombia
- Spanish conquest of the Muisca
- Muisca
- Aztec, Maya warfare
