= Tisquesusa =

Tribal ruler in pre-Spanish Colombia

- Zipa of Bacatá
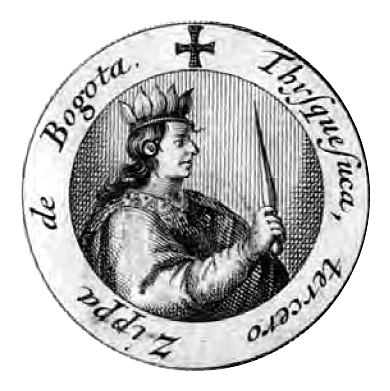
- Tisquesusa depicted in 1688 on the cover of Historia general de las conquistas del Nuevo Reyno de Granada by Lucas Fernández de Piedrahita

Zipa of Bacatá
- Reign: 1514 – 1537
- Predecessor: Nemequene
- Successor: Sagipa
- Nephew: unknown
- Born: unknown Bacatá, Muisca Confederation
- Died: 1537; Facatativá, Bacatá, Muisca Confederation
- Sister: Usaca
- Issue: Hama (son); Machinza (daughter)
Names
- Tisquesusa, Thisquesuza, Thysquesuca, Thisquesusha, Bogotá
- House: Bacatá
- Religion: Muisca religion

Tisquesusa, also spelled Thisquesuza, Thysquesuca, or Thisquesusha, referred to in the earliest sources as Bogotá, the Elder, (died Facatativá, 1537) was the fourth and last independent ruler (psihipqua) of Muyquytá, main settlement of the southern Muisca between 1514 and his death in 1537. The Spanish pronunciation of his name brought about the Colombian capital Bogotá. Tisquesusa was the ruler of the southern Muisca Confederation at the time of the Spanish conquest of the Muisca, when the troops led by Gonzalo Jiménez de Quesada and his brother entered the central Andean highlands.

== Name ==
The name Tisquesusa originates from the work Elegías de varones ilustres de Indias written by poet Juan de Castellanos decades after the events of the conquest. In his work, he names Tisquesusa as the zipa. However, the origin of this name is unknown, and Jorge Gamboa Mendoza, among others, maintains the name was originally "Bogotá". Later chroniclers, such as Pedro Simón simply took the names from earlier sources without verifying them.

== Biography ==
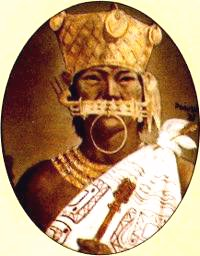
Depiction of Tisquesusa

Tisquesusa was cacique of Chía and following the Muisca heritage rules, he, as nephew of the previous ruler Nemequene, succeeded his uncle in 1514. At the start of his reign, Tisquesusa fought against the Panche in the west of the Muisca Confederation. The brother of Tisquesusa and later—according to Muisca heritage rule illegal—successor Sagipa was the general in the southern Muisca army. Early on in his reign, Tisquesusa went to war with the northern Muisca ruled by Quemuenchatocha. Forty thousands guecha warriors of the southern Muisca fought against fifty thousand northern Muisca. Earlier, support of the iraca Sugamuxi of the Iraca Valley helped the northern troops in their battles, but this time the third party helped in settling a truce between both parties which lasted until the arrival of the Spanish conquistadores in 1537.

=== The Spanish conquest ===
The arrival of the Spanish conquerors was revealed to Tisquesusa by the mohan Popón, from the village of Ubaque. He told the Muisca ruler that foreigners were coming and Tisquesusa would die "bathing in his own blood". When Tisquesusa was informed of the advancing invasion of the Spanish soldiers, he sent a spy to Suesca to find out more about their army strength, weapons and with how many warriors they could be beaten. The psihipqua left the capital Muyquytá and took shelter in Nemocón which directed the Spanish troops to there, during this march attacked by more than 600 Muisca warriors.

When Tisquesusa retreated to his fortified place in Cajicá he allegedly told his men he would not be able to combat against the strong Spanish army in possession of weapons that produced "thunder and lightning". He chose to return to Bacatá and ordered the capital to be evacuated, resulting in an abandoned site when the Spanish arrived. In search for the Muisca ruler, the conquistadors went north to find Tisquesusa in the surroundings of Facatativá where they attacked him at night.

Alonso Domínguez, one of De Quesada's soldiers, thrust his sword at Tisquesusa, but without knowing he was the zipa, he let him go after taking the expensive mantle of the ruler. Tisquesusa fled hurt into the mountains and died of his wounds there. His body was only discovered a year later because of the black vultures circling over it.

At the death of Tisquesusa, his son Hama and daughter Machinza hid the sister of the psihipqua, Usaca, in one of the settlements on the Bogotá savanna. When one of the conquistadors, Juan María Cortés, found out about this, he prepared a battle to gain control over the area. At that moment, Usaca appeared and resisted against the Spanish conqueror. Legend tells that he dropped his weapons and fell in love with her, eventually marrying the sister of Tisquesusa, and they were baptized in Usaquén, meaning "Land of the Sun" in Muysccubun. This formed the start of the construction of a colonial village, today part of the capital and known for its colonial architecture and parks.

=== Succession to the throne ===
Contrary to Muisca tradition, where the eldest son of the oldest sister of the previous ruler would become the next zipa, the reign was taken over by Tisquesusa's brother; his army general Sagipa. This would be the last ruler of the southern Muisca, defeated in 1538 and died of Spanish torture in early 1539.

=== Tisquesusa in Muisca history ===
History of the Muisca
Altiplano	Muisca	Art	Architecture	Astronomy	Cuisine	El Dorado	Subsistence	Women	Conquest

== See also ==
- Spanish conquest of the Muisca
- Muisca rulers
- History of Bogotá
