= Saguanmachica =

Saguanmachica may refer to:

- Cibyra saguanmachica, a species of moth endemic to Colombia
- Saguamanchica, second ruler (zipa) of the southern Muisca in central Colombia
