= Nemequene =

Tribal ruler

- Zipa of Bacatá
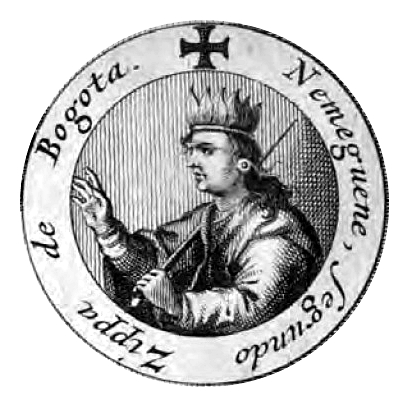
- Nemequene depicted in 1688 on the cover of Historia general de las conquistas del Nuevo Reyno de Granada by Juan de Castellanos

Zipa of Bacatá
- Reign: c. 1490 – 1514
- Predecessor: Saguamanchica
- Successor: Tisquesusa
- Nephew: Tisquesusa
- Born: unknown Bacatá, Muisca Confederation
- Died: 1514; Near modern Ventaquemada, Samacá, Hunza, Muisca Confederation
Names
- Nemequene, Nemeguene, Nymy Quyne, Jaguar Bone or Jaguar Force
- House: Bacatá
- Religion: Muisca religion

Nemequene or Nemeguene (died 1514) was the third ruler (zipa) of Bacatá as of 1490. His zaque counterpart ruling over the northern area of the Muisca territory was Quemuenchatocha.

== Etymology ==
Nemequene in the Chibcha language of the Muisca has two possible meanings, derived from the words nymy, "jaguar" and quyne, meaning either "bone" or "force".

== Biography ==
Nemequene succeeded to the throne of the southern Muisca in 1490 after the death of his predecessor Saguamanchica in the Battle of Chocontá where the zaque of the northern Muisca Michuá had also died. While Nemequene wanted to continue the attacks against the northern Muisca, he had to face the dangers of the Panche to the west of his territory. Nemequene installed his nephew and legal successor Tisquesusa as army general to fight off the Panche with success.

Looking to expand the territory of the southern Muisca, Nemequene succeeded in the conquest of other areas in the central highlands of Colombia; the zipa defeated the cacique of Guatavita and submitted the cacicazgos of Ubaque, Ubaté, Susa, and Fúquene to his rule.

At the end of his reign, Nemequene took up arms against the northern Muisca again, with Tisquesusa and his brother Sagipa as army commanders. Zaque Quemuenchatocha gained support of the caciques of Gámeza, Iraca, Tundama, and Sáchica. The battle of the Arroyo de las Vueltas that followed lasted for half a day and just when Nemequene was about to claim victory, he was hit by an arrow by one of the guecha warriors of the northern Muisca and died five days later of his wounds. Sagipa, the later successor of Tisquesusa and last zipa of the Muisca ordered retreat. Tisquesusa succeeded his uncle as ruler of the southern Muisca until the arrival of the Spanish conquistadors led by Gonzalo Jiménez de Quesada.

=== Code of Nemequene ===
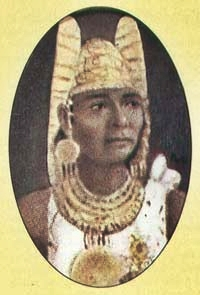
Depiction of Nemequene

To impose order, discipline and authority, Nemequene installed a cruel and excessive code. Based on the traditions and customs of the Muisca he ordered that in case of crimes against sexual honor (especially incest, rape, and sodomy), property or the rule of the state short trials and fierce punishments would be installed. Part of the code was targeted at moral behavior such as "don't lie" and "don't be lazy".

If the defendant was unmarried, he was sentenced to death. In the case of being married, he would be dishonored by forcing his wife to publicly live together with two men. Thieves were sentenced to be stabbed with burning sticks. Defaulting indebted Muisca were forbidden to use fire. Who had shown to be a coward in warfare was forced to wear women's clothes and perform the tasks of women. The ordinary Muisca were not allowed to wear expensive clothes or jewelry. Muisca men were forbidden to leave their wives and if she died doing labor the spouse was ordered to pay off her family.

Bishop Lucas Fernández de Piedrahita wrote in the 17th century about the punishment against incest: "When a man committed incest with his mother, daughter, sister or niece, he would be thrown in a narrow pit filled with water where crawling bugs would be thrown in. The pit was covered with a slab and the victim died a horrible death."

=== Nemequene in Muisca history ===
History of the Muisca
Altiplano	Muisca	Art	Architecture	Astronomy	Cuisine	El Dorado	Subsistence	Women	Conquest

== Trivia ==
- Nemocón, the second most important salt mining settlement of the Muisca, is named after Nemequene

== See also ==
- Nemocón
- Muisca rulers, history of Bogotá
