= Saguamanchica =

- Zipa of Bacatá
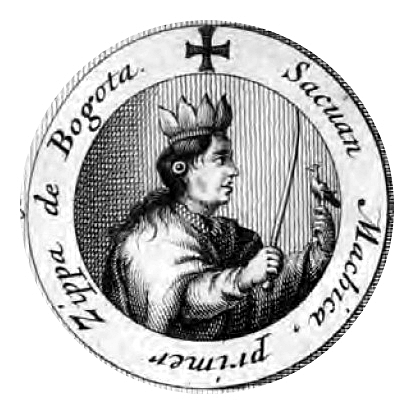
- Saguamanchica depicted in 1688 on the cover of Historia general de las conquistas del Nuevo Reyno de Granada by Juan de Castellanos

Zipa of Bacatá
- Reign: c. 1470 – 1490
- Predecessor: Meicuchuca
- Successor: Nemequene
- Nephew: Nemequene

Cacique of Chía
- Zipa: Meicuchuca
- Born: unknown Bacatá, Muisca Confederation
- Died: c. 1490; Chocontá, Guatavita, Bacatá, Muisca Confederation
- Issue: Usminia
Names
- Saguamanchica, Sacuan Machica, Saguanmachica or Saguanmanchica
- House: Bacatá
- Religion: Muisca religion

Saguamanchica (died Chocontá, 1490) was the second ruler (zipa) of Muyquytá, as of 1470. His zaque enemy ruling over the northern area of the Muisca territory was Michuá.

Alternative spellings of his name are Sacuan Machica, Saguanmachica and Saguanmanchica.

== Biography ==
As former cacique of Chía, Saguamanchica accessed the throne of the southern Muisca around 1470. His predecessor, the first zipa of Muyquytá Meicuchuca, left him a rich kingdom with many guecha warriors. This led Saguamanchica to seek expansion of his zipazgo.

The first campaign of warfare he planned was to submit the eternal enemies of the Muisca, the Panche and the Sutagao to the west of the Muisca territories. The Carib-speaking peoples formed an alliance against their common and far outnumbered enemy. Saguamanchica together with his vassal Pasca defeated his enemies led by general Uzatama with ease and annexed Fusagasugá and Tibacuy.

The expansion policies of the southern Muisca upset the cacique of Guatavita and he sought help with the zaque in Hunza, Michuá. The northern ruler sent a messenger to the court of Saguamanchica in Bacatá but he was mistreated there. Saguamanchica and Michuá confronted each other with armies of 40,000 respectively 30,000 warriors but there was no battle fought and a truce settled. In the meantime however the cacique of Ubaque, ally of the northern Muisca, had conquered Usme and Pasca on Saguamanchica's rule. The zipa sent his army to the taken areas and defeated the cacique, banishing him. Saguamanchica also submitted the towns of Zipaquirá, Ubaté, Simijaca and Susa.

The times of war were continuing as Saguamanchica attacked the Panche, who had taken Zipacón and Tena, and the cacicazgo of Guatavita having conquered Chía and Cajicá upon the zipa.

Around 1490 Saguamanchica decided to attack the hoa with an army of 50,000 warriors marching through Guatavita to Chocontá facing 60,000 troops led by Michuá. In the three hour Battle of Chocontá both rulers Saguamanchica and Michuá died, while the former has won. Eucaneme took over the hoa rule for the northern Muisca and Nemequene, as nephew of Saguamanchica legal heir for the throne in Muyquytá, succeeded his uncle, eventually becoming a brutal ruler.

=== Saguamanchica in Muisca history ===
History of the Muisca
Altiplano	Muisca	Art	Architecture	Astronomy	Cuisine	El Dorado	Subsistence	Women	Conquest

== Trivia ==
- The moth species Cibyra saguanmachica, endemic to Colombia, is named after Saguamanchica

== See also ==
- Muisca warfare
- Muisca rulers, history of Bogotá
