= Guahaioque =

Deity in the religion of the Muisca

- Evil, stealing, lies, death
- Member of Muisca religion
- Region: Altiplano Cundiboyacense; Colombia
- Ethnic group: Muisca

Equivalents
- Christian: Devil

Guahaioque was a minor deity in the religion of the Muisca. It was the god of evil, stealing, lies and death.

== Etymology ==
The name Guahaioque in the language of the Muisca, Muysccubun, means "figure of the deceased". The name Guahaioque lives on as the name of a folk metal band from Cali.

== See also ==
- Muisca
- Muisca warfare
- Muisca religion
