= Michuá =

- zaque
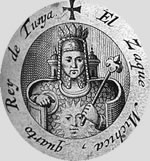
- Michuá, ruler of Hunza
- Reign: 1470–1490
- Predecessor: Hunzahúa
- Successor: Quemuenchatocha
- Born: unknown Muisca Confederation
- Died: 1490; Chocontá, Muisca Confederation
- Dynasty: Hunza

Michuá or Michica (died 1490 in Chocontá) was the second zaque of Hunza, currently known as Tunja, as of 1470. His contemporary enemy zipa of the southern Muisca was Saguamanchica.

== Biography ==
Little is known about the history of Michuá, who accessed the throne of the northern Muisca in 1470. He broke the political peace established under his predecessor Hunzahúa and fought a 16-year war with the southern enemies led by Saguamanchica. The latter, supported by his vassal Pasca conquered Fusagasugá and Tibacuy. Saguamanchica attempted to submit the cacique of Guatavita who asked Michúa for assistance. Michuá sent a messenger to Bacatá to negotiate the zipa would listen to the complaints of the cacique. Saguamanchica was not amused by undermining his authority and abused the messenger.

When Michuá found out about the mistreatment of his messenger he sent an army of forty thousand guecha warriors to the zipa. Realising the strength of the army Saguamanchica redirected his army against the independent cacique of Ubaque who attacked Pasca and Usme and defended his reign against Guatavita and the Panche.

Around 1490 Saguamanchica decided to attack the zaque with an army of 50,000 warriors marching through Guatavita to Chocontá, in the Chibcha language meaning "Garden of the neighbour". In the three hour Battle of Chocontá the stronger army of Michuá lost against the zipa and both rulers Saguamanchica and Michuá died. Quemuenchatocha took over the zaque rule for the northern Muisca and Nemequene, nephew of Saguamanchica, became the new zipa of Bacatá.

=== Michuá in Muisca history ===
History of the Muisca
| Altiplano | Muisca | Art | Architecture | Astronomy | Cuisine | El Dorado | Subsistence | Women | Conquest |

== See also ==
- Muisca rulers, history of Colombia
