= Women in Muisca society =

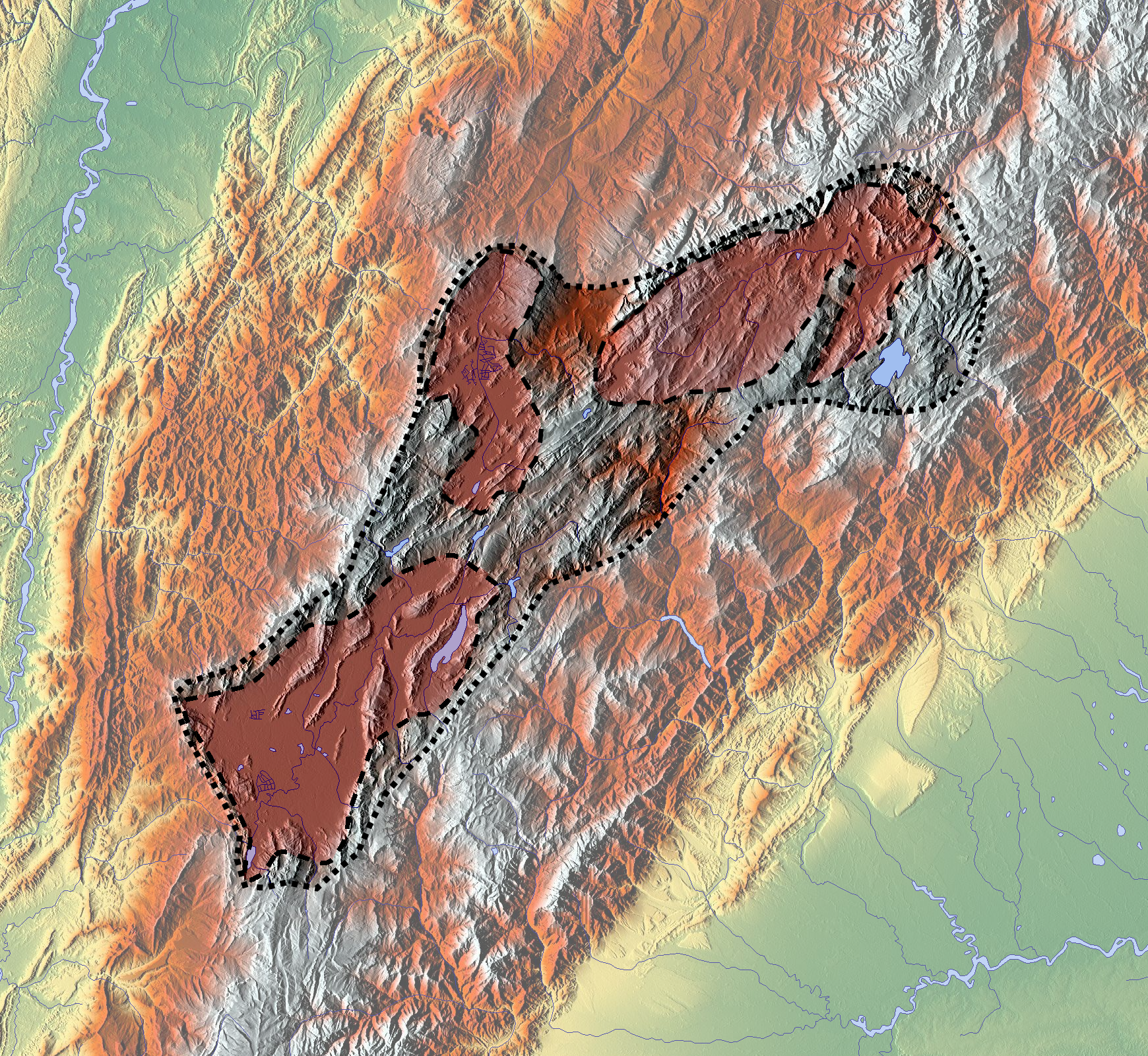
The Altiplano Cundiboyacense with valley subdivisions; the living space of the Muisca

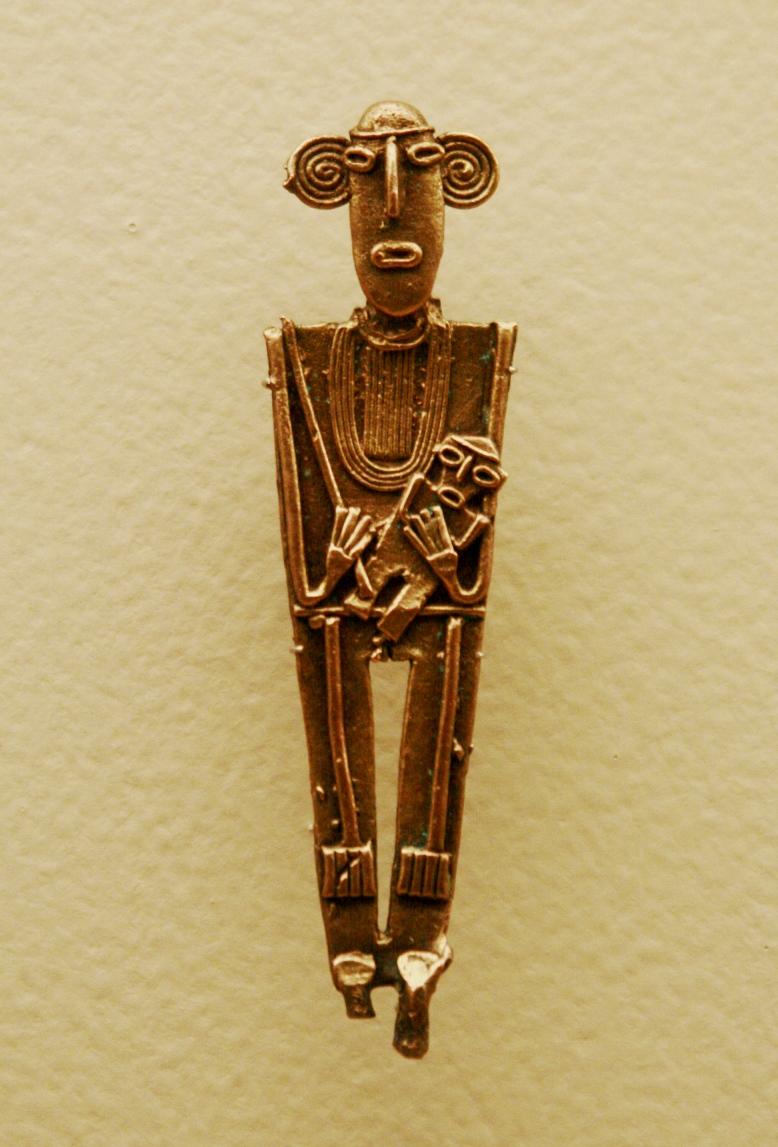
The Muisca are famous for their fine goldworking; a tunjo representing mother and son

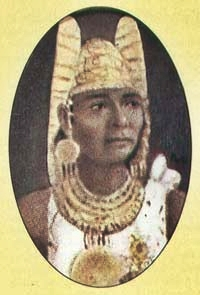
Southern Muisca ruler Nemequene installed a system of laws (Code of Nemequene) with harsh punishments for adultery, rape, incest and infidelity and arranged for widows to inherit the properties of their deceased husbands

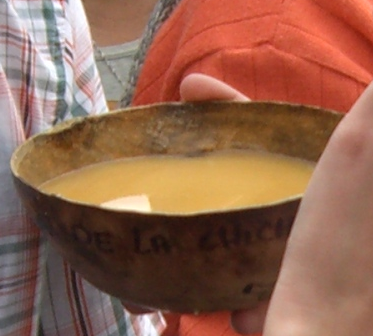
The Muisca women prepared and sold the alcoholic beverage chicha

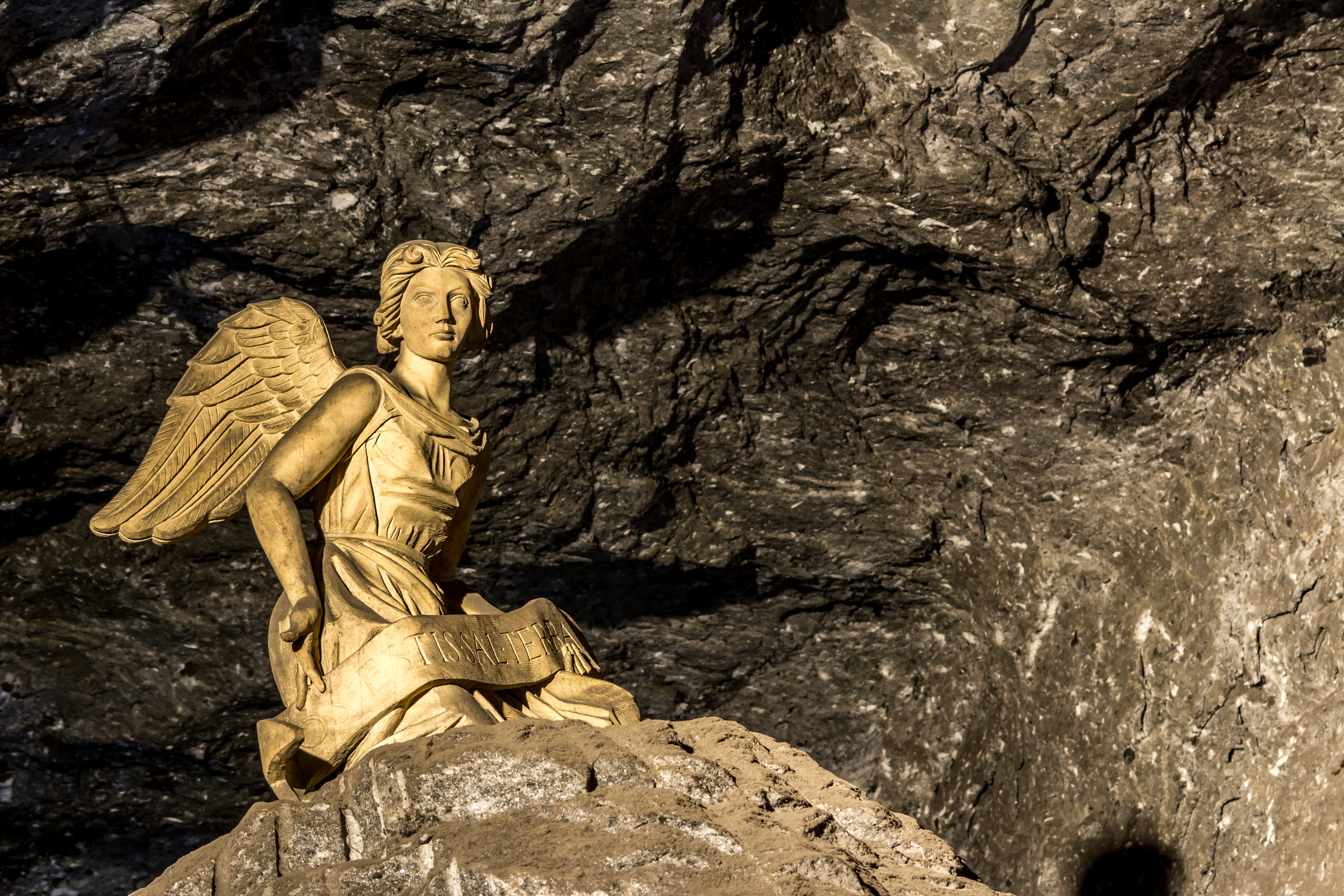
The halite of Zipaquirá, used for cooking, preservation of meat and fish and as trading product, was extracted from a brine by the Muisca women

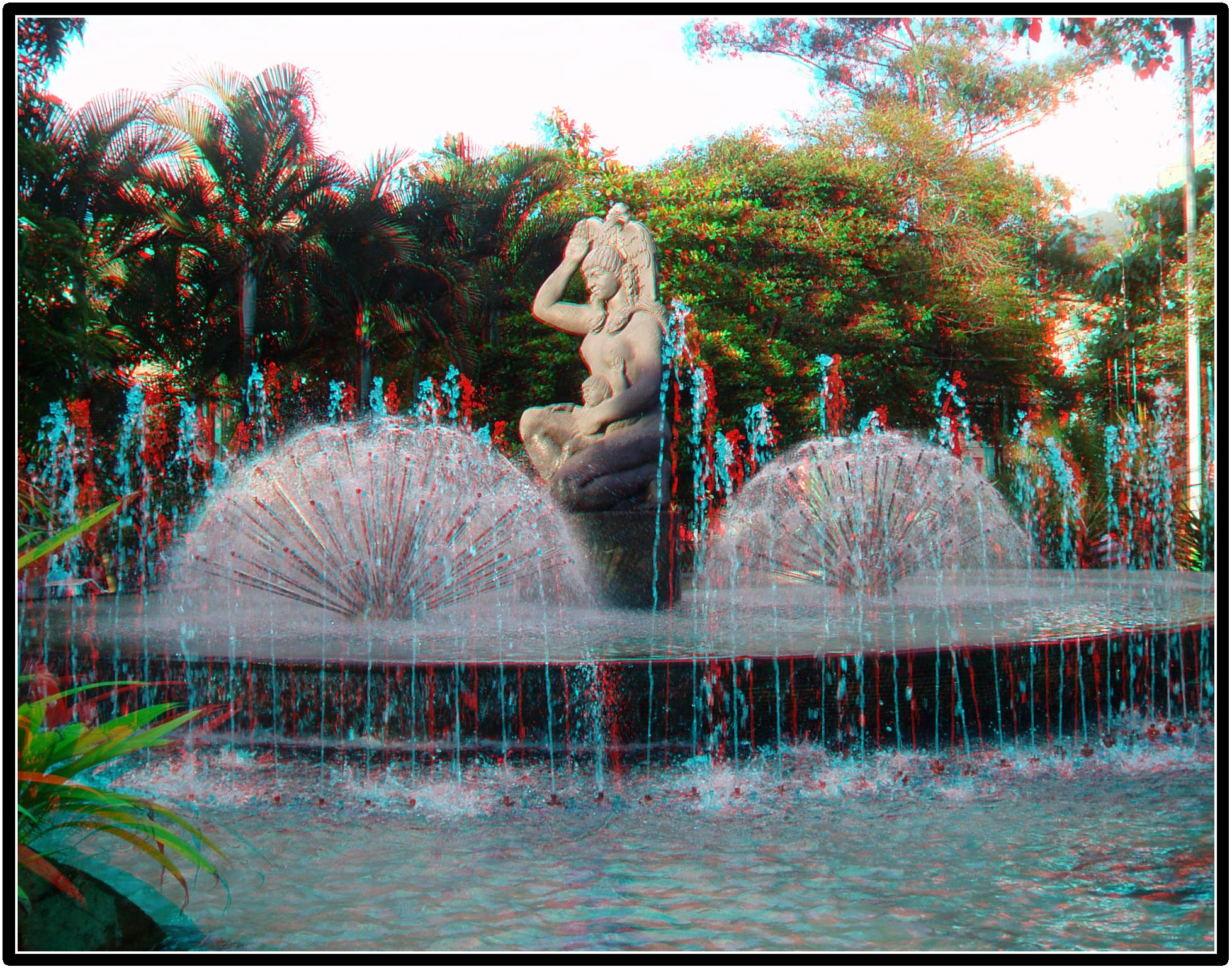
Mother goddess Bachué was one of the most important deities of the Muisca

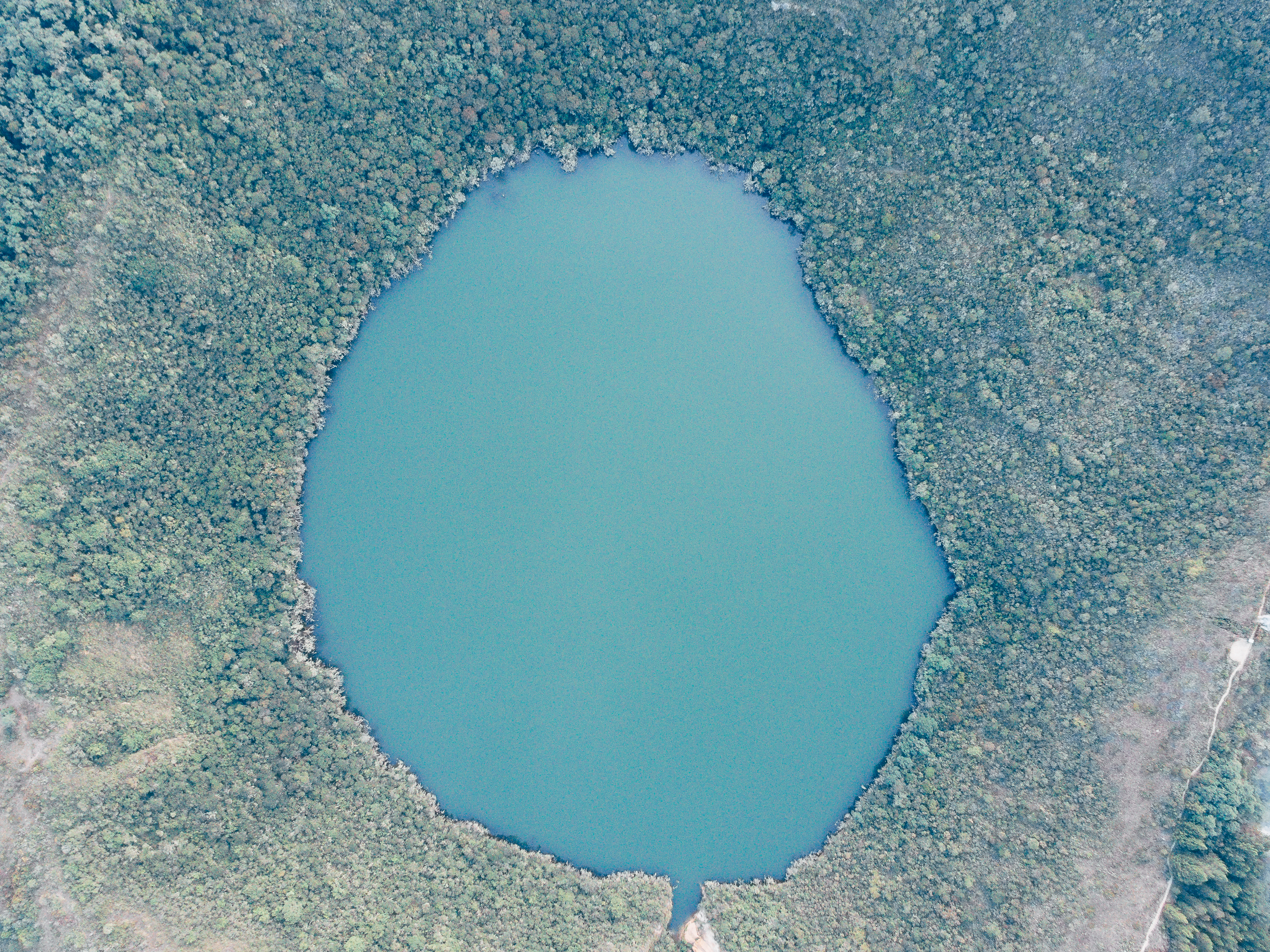
Sacred Lake Guatavita, where the disloyal wife of the cacique drowned herself after her lover was killed and dismembered

This article describes the role of women in Muisca society. The Muisca were the original inhabitants of the Altiplano Cundiboyacense (present-day central Colombian Andes) before the Spanish conquest in the first half of the 16th century. Their society was one of the four great civilizations of the Americas.

Women held an important and largely egalitarian role in Muisca society. While men were responsible for hunting, warfare, and other activities, women took charge of sowing the fields, preparing food and chicha, and educating children. Both men and women participated in religious rituals. The most important deities in Muisca culture were female: Chía, the goddess of the Moon; Huitaca, the goddess of sexual liberation; and Bachué, the mother goddess of the Muisca people.

While the first chroniclers during the period of conquest and early colonization—such as Gonzalo Jiménez de Quesada, Pedro Simón, Juan de Castellanos and Lucas Fernández de Piedrahita—were all male, 20th- and 21st-century anthropology has seen significant contributions from women scholars. Key contributors to the understanding of women in Muisca society include Muisca scholars Ana María Groot, Marianne Cardale de Schrimpff, Sylvia Broadbent, Ana María Gómez Londoño, Martha Herrera Ángel, among others.

== Background ==
Following the largely pre-ceramic Herrera Period, the Muisca people settled in the valleys and high-altitude terrains of the Altiplano Cundiboyacense, in the Eastern Ranges of the Colombian Andes. Estimates of the population size at the time of the Spanish conquest in 1537 range from 300,000 to two million people. The Muisca were predominantly farmers and merchants, with a loosely organized political structure known as the Muisca Confederation. They practiced agriculture on simple terraces on mountain slopes and on the high plains of the Altiplano, particularly the Bogotá savanna. Their main crops included maize, potatoes, arracacha, tubers, beans, yuca, pumpkins, gourds, tomatoes, peppers, cotton, pineapples, avocadoes, tobacco, quinoa, and coca.

The Muisca are renowned for their highly developed art, especially their goldwork. Unlike the other three well-known civilizations of the Americas—the Maya, Aztec and Inca—the Muisca did not build grand architectural structures.

== Muisca words for women ==
The Muisca language, Muysccubun, had several words to refer to women in different contexts. These included gui, meaning "wife" or "niece," literally "daughter of the sister of the mother"; gyca, meaning "sister-in-law," literally "wife of the brother" or "sister of the husband"; pabcha, meaning "niece," literally "daughter of the sister of the father"; and fucha, meaning "her" or "female."

== Women in Muisca society ==
In pre-Columbian societies, women played a central role in shaping the understanding of the world, structuring family and community, participating in religious life, working in the fields, and contributing to mythology, arts, and all aspects of societal organization. Women were seen as the foundation of cultural continuity, with their fertility closely linked to the abundance of Muisca agriculture. They were trained in tasks such as sowing and harvesting, food preparation, textile work, ceramics, and participation in sacred ceremonies.

In Muisca civilization, particularly under the Code of Nemequene, women—especially the wives of caciques—held certain rights over their husbands. The Code established a system of harsh penalties intended to maintain social stability, particularly in cases of adultery, deceit, incest, and rape. Muisca men were forbidden from abandoning their wives, and if a woman died while working, her husband was required to compensate her family. Female infidelity was punished by forcing the woman to engage with the ten least desirable men of the tribe and subjecting her to periods of fasting.

The wives of community leaders wore skirts that reached their ankles, while common women wore skirts that extended to their knees. Maids, sometimes referred to as concubines, were called tegui.

A census conducted in 1780 in Bogotá, the capital of the Viceroyalty of New Granada, revealed that women comprised 63.5% of the city's population. Indigenous women migrated to the capital for two main reasons: to work in the households of Spanish colonizers and to seek husbands, as mestizo status offered them greater security.

=== Matriliny ===
Muisca women played a crucial role in the organization of the family and in supporting the Muisca rulers. Children belonged to their mothers, and in matters of inheritance, property was assigned to the mother rather than the father. The new zipa and zaque were traditionally chosen from the eldest sons of the elder sister of the previous ruler, and women had the freedom to live together for a period to ensure that the relationship was successful and that they were fertile. After marriage, total fidelity was expected.

Examples of the law of matrilineal inheritance were evident in the later stages of Muisca civilization. Around the time of the arrival of the Spanish conquistadores, Tisquesusa was succeeded by his brother, Sagipa.

=== Gender roles ===
Muisca women were considered vital for transferring their fertility to the farmlands, which meant they were responsible for sowing the fields, while men engaged in hunting, fishing, and warfare with neighboring groups such as the Panche. Women also prepared and sold the Muisca alcoholic beverage, chicha. To aid in the fermentation process, they chewed on maize kernels. During rituals, which could last up to fifteen days, women sang. Muisca laws protected women from physical attacks and ensured that pregnant women received special treatment, which continued during the early years of motherhood and in cases of widowhood. The food of the Muisca, eaten while sitting on the ground of their bohíos, was uniquely prepared by the women.

Women also played an important role in the extraction of salt. The Muisca, known as "The Salt People" due to their salt mines in Zipaquirá, Nemocón, and Tausa, extracted salt by evaporating brine in large pots. They used the salt in their cuisine, for the preparation of dried fish and meat, and as a product in their economy.

=== Relationship customs ===
Like many other pre-Columbian cultures, the Muisca practiced polygamy. Accounts of the number of wives vary, but it was common for high-caste caciques to have up to twenty wives (gueta). Some sources even report that certain rulers had as many as one hundred spouses. Less reliable accounts, such as those by Vicente Restrepo in the 19th century, suggest numbers as high as 300 wives. Having multiple wives enabled the most prominent Muisca rulers to cultivate larger farmlands than those of lower castes. When the principal wife of a cacique, zaque, or zipa died, the male ruler was required to abstain from sexual relations for five years.

Virginity was not highly regarded in Muisca society; in fact, women who were virgins were often considered unattractive. An exception to this perception was made for virgins captured from neighboring indigenous groups (such as the Panche, Muzo, Lache, Guayupe, Guane, and Chitarero), who were used in ceremonies as sacrifices.

In general, the practices of polygamy, the period of cohabitation before marriage, the lack of emphasis on virginity, and the resulting sexual promiscuity in pre-Columbian Colombia were very different from the norms and laws that emerged during the later Spanish colonial period.

== Religion and mythology ==
In Muisca religion, as in other pre-Columbian religions in the Americas, various deities were female and among the most important. The inhabitation of the Earth is explained by the mother goddess Bachué, who is said to have been born in Lake Iguaque in present-day Boyacá. One of the major deities in Muisca religion was Chía, the goddess of the Moon. She was worshipped throughout the Muisca Confederation, especially in her Moon Temple in the city named after her, Chía, Cundinamarca. Chía symbolized placental life, games, and dances. The rituals at Muisca temples were inclusive, with men and women participating together.

The Moon Temple served not only as a place of worship but also as an educational center for new caciques and Muisca rulers, with instruction provided nearby at the Seminario de la Quyca.

Huitaca was the rebellious goddess of arts, dance, music, witchcraft, and sexual liberation among the Muisca. While she is sometimes equated with Chía, she is primarily regarded as a separate deity. In Muisca religion, it was Huitaca who caused the Funza River to overflow, prompting the Muisca to inhabit higher terrains on the Bogotá savanna.

Cuchavira, the god of the rainbow, protected women while they worked in the fields, referred to in the Chibcha language as tá. This is reflected in many toponyms of the area today, such as Bogotá, Chivatá, Cucaita, Guayatá, Machetá, and Tota, among others.

According to the chronicler Bernardo de Sahagún, newborn girls were sometimes offered to the Muisca gods. This practice was accepted by the Muisca people, who viewed their gods as integral to their community and believed it ensured the fertility of their lands.

=== Lake Guatavita ===
A story in Muisca mythology recounts the tale of the wife of the cacique of Guatavita and her disloyalty to her husband. As punishment for her actions, the people tortured her lover, a guecha warrior, by cutting off his genitals and consuming them in a ceremonial ritual. In grief, the cacique's wife jumped into the lake with her son and drowned. The cacique, mourning their deaths, ordered the retrieval of their bodies from the lake.

This story formed the basis for the sacred Lake Guatavita and later inspired the legend of El Dorado, as narrated by the early Spanish chronicler Pedro Simón.

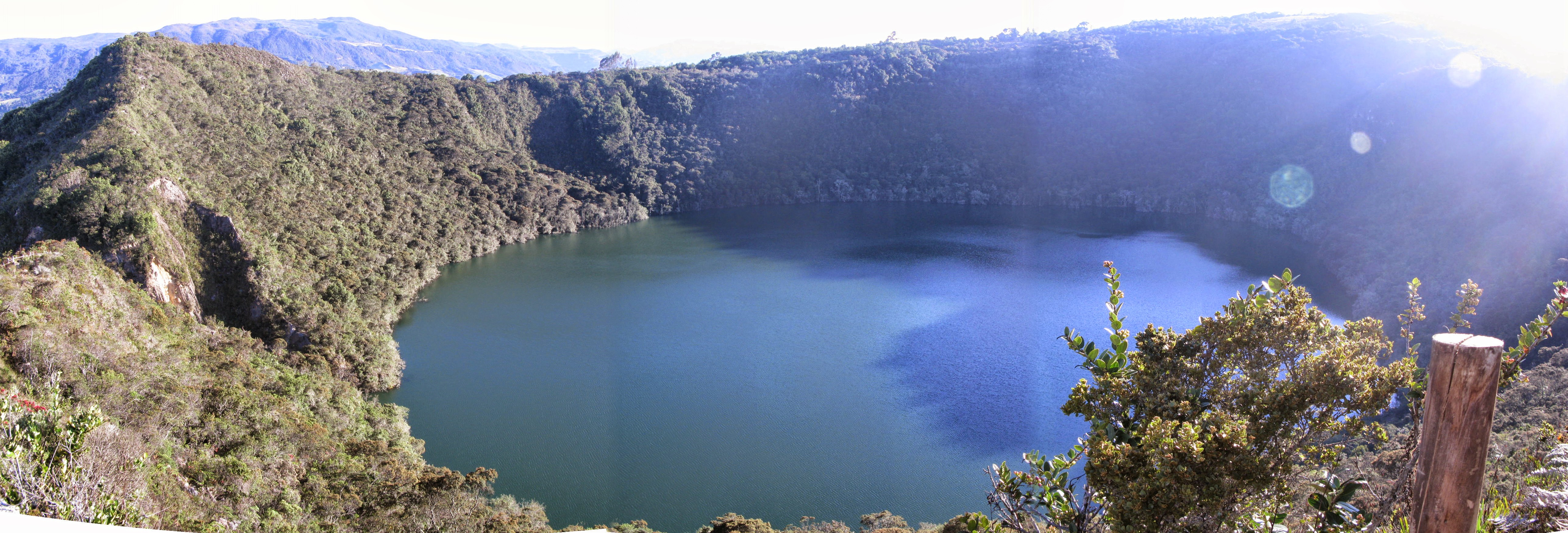
Lake Guatavita

== Famous Muisca women ==
- Magdalena of Guatavita
- Noncetá
- Usaca
- Zoratama

== Notable female Muisca scientists ==
- Soledad Acosta Samper
- Ana María Groot de Mahecha
- Marianne Cardale de Schrimpff
- Sylvia M. Broadbent
- Margarita Silva Montaña
- Others

== See also ==
- Wife selling (English custom)
- Gender roles among the indigenous peoples of North America, women in the Catholic Church
- Gender roles in Mesoamerica
- Women in Maya society
