= Cibyra saguanmachica =

Scientific classification
- Domain: Eukaryota
- Kingdom: Animalia
- Phylum: Arthropoda
- Class: Insecta
- Order: Lepidoptera
- Family: Hepialidae
- Genus: Cibyra
- Species: C. saguanmachica

Binomial name
- Cibyra saguanmachica (Pfitzner, 1914)

Synonyms
- Dalaca saguanmachica Pfitzner, 1914

Species of moth

Cibyra saguanmachica is a species of moth of the family Hepialidae. It is known from Colombia.

== Etymology ==
The moth is named after Saguamanchica, the second ruler (zipa) of the southern Muisca with capital Bacatá.
