= Muisca rulers =

Rulers of loose chiefdoms in pre-Spanish Colombia

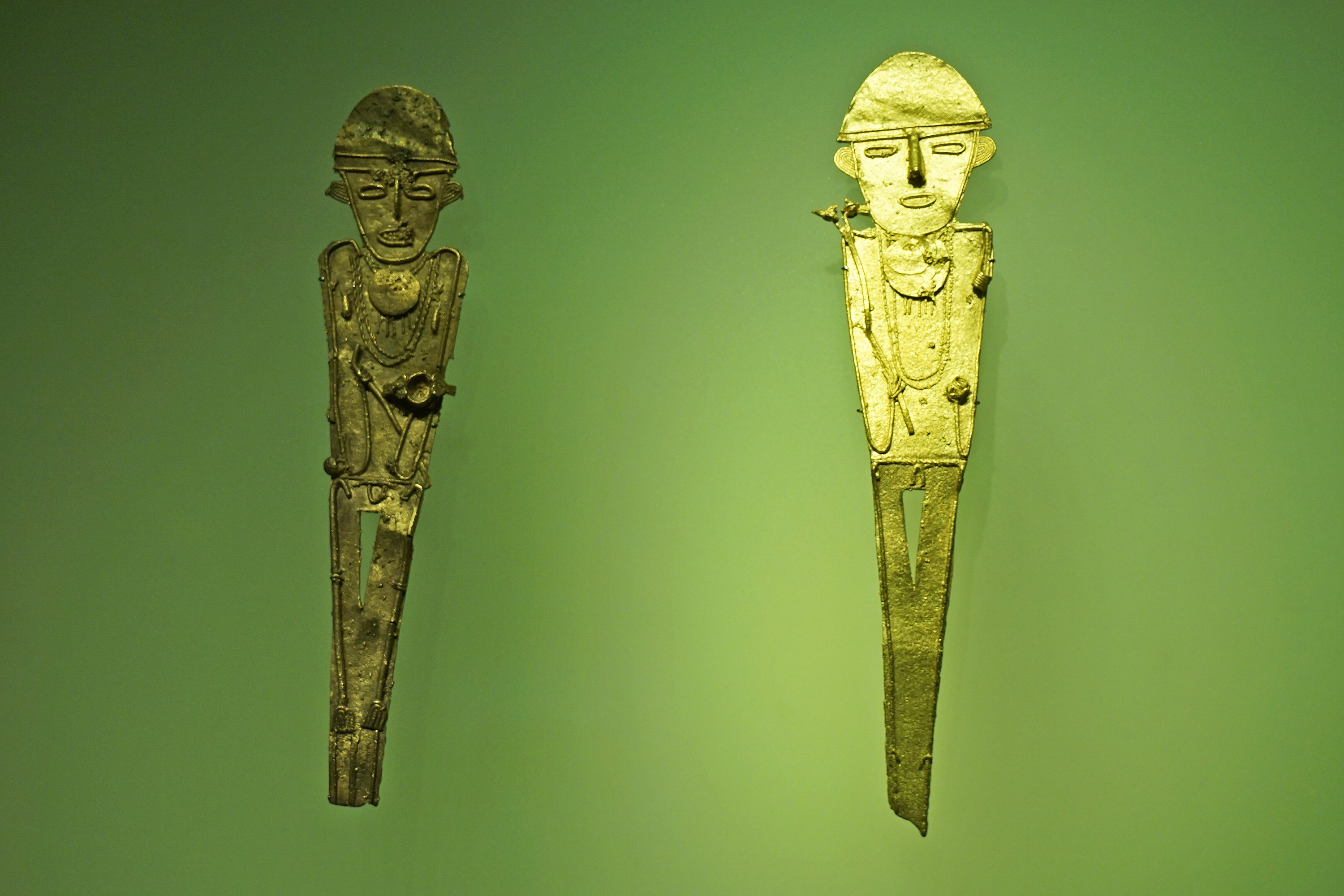
Muisca Tunjos.

Muisca rulers were so-called "aggrandizers", that is charismatic leaders at the head of various factions, who forged alliances and relations of subordination with various communities and ruled over the Muisca, a pre-hispanic indigenous group of the Altiplano Cundiboyacense in the Eastern Andes, at the center of modern-day Colombia. The Muisca communities did not have a unified political entity, but were ruled by several chiefdoms or cacicazgos, some of which formed confederations of chiefdoms. At the time of the Spanish invasion, four confederations were thriving in Muisca territory: Bogotá, Tunja, Duitama and Sogamoso. Additionally, there were independent chiefdoms in the north-west. The Chibcha-speaking Guane and Lache were also ruled by the confederation of Guanentá and the confederation of El Cocuy respectively.

Power was based simultaneously on prestige and authority, in the form of rules of succession and a degree of popular consent. Economically, chiefs (or caciques) are in permanent competition to show strengthen their legitimacy and power (and finance artisanery) by redistributing an accumulated surplus of goods. Chiefs had a distributing role as organizers of Muisca tamsas (erroneously translated as "tributes"), in receiving goods from their subjects and redistributing the accumulated products in exchange for labor.

== Muisca chiefdoms and capitanías ==
Muisca chiefdoms were centralized, but not state-like, as communities remained autonomous. There were four or five levels of political hierarchy: At the base, there were the minor matrilineal units named uta, which constituted major units (sybyn or zybin); sybyn formed chiefdoms, some of which were organized into confederations. Additionally, some chiefdoms of border-areas of the Bogotá confederation were uzacazgos (like Pasca or Guasca), and represented an intermediate level of hierarchy between chiefdoms and confederations. Generally, a sybyn was a village and uta were groups of houses, however cases ave been documented of sybyn and uta existing independently. Potentially, there existed groups of one sybyn (major) and one uta (minor) unit, as the Muisca had a dualistic thought. Power was loose however, especially when subordinated territoires were far from the political center. In modern-day Colombia, chiefdoms might correspond to municipios and capitanías to veredas.

The Spaniards called basic matrilineal units, whether sybyn or uta, "capitanías", and the rulers of these entities were called "capitanes" (captains) in Spanish. In muysccubun, a major captain was called sybyntiba or tybarogue, and a minor captain was known as a tybarogue, utatiba, or just uta.

== Non-patrilineal heritage of rule ==
The position of the ruler was inherited, but the line of succession was not patrilineal. Instead, the chief was succeeded by his nephew, the oldest son of his oldest sister. There were exceptions, and the ruler's subjects, apparently, had some say in the matter, if only to confirm the successor in his post. Other family members inherited furniture of the chief.

== Legitimacy ==
The legitimacy of chiefs was founded on individual prestige and institutional authority. The centre of a chiefs domaine is his cercado or enclosure. The power of chiefs is not measured in terms of gold or money, but by the sumptuous decorations of the cercado's wooden palisades and by the chief's exotic clothing. Inside cercados, the chief possesses multiple structures, including his and his wive's residences and various stockhouses. Powerful chiefs had large cercados, whose vicinity was occupied by markets, feasts and ceremonies, whose surroundings were settled by multiple subordinated entities. However, the traditional interpretation of cercados as places where powerful chiefs, supposedly belonging to an elite composed of lineages, demonstrated their political domination has not been conclusively proven archaeologically, and is most likely to be associated with colonial misunderstandings. The cercado legitimised social and political relations as an axis mundi, and as spatial representation of tradition and continuity. Muisca elites built their legitimacy around the metonymical concept of gue ("house"; by extension "community" as opposed to "gueba", foreigner or sacrifice of foreigners), considered as a living thing, and it's needs (feeding). Principles of seniority (guexica, "grandfather") and rules of succession (guecha, "uncle" or "warrior"), both related to the "gue" concept, were the basis for the chief's legitimacy. Polyginy (a form of polygamy) was, contrary to the sayings of some colonial-era writers, most likely a privilege of chiefs and captains. The chief's main wife was the only true "partner", of the same rank and power as the chief himself. She was imposed on him by the members the ruling class. Before assuming their function, chiefs spend multiple years in a closed bohío, before receiving the ear and lip pendants characteristic of their function. Muisca chiefs' seats are similar to the Caribbean duho, as they are low and have an elongated form.

Redistributing the surplus of accumulated goods to the subjects was a fundamental part of achieving legitimacy. Indeed, a certain degree of popular consent was necessary. The chiefs power is individualistic and not institutionalized, and alliances are variously formed with sybyn (major basic units), uta (minor basic units) and individual gue (houses).

=== Minor capitanías (uta) ===
In some cases, the function of captain of a minor unit was hereditary, and in others it was assigned by the chief.

== Role ==
The main role of chiefs was to "feed" and serve of the deities, the settlement (a living thing), and the subjects. Additionally, the role of the chief was to distribute the accumulated goods during "tamsas", falsely translated as "tributes". The chief of Sogamoso, where the Sun Temple was located, cumulated religious and political functions. Reciprocity was practiced between members of the elite. Because of the ambiguity of the Spanish term "capitanía", the exact role of captains (at the head of basic matrilineal units) remains uncertain. There is disagreement between Carl Henrik Langebaek and Jorge Augusto Gamboa on the exact politico.-economic role of chiefs, as the latter argues for a "moduler or cellular" model similar to Mesoamerica.

== Organization of Muisca territory ==
Map of the Muisca territory according to Falchetti and Plazas in the 1970s. This map has received criticism, however, as it mainly uses the late 17th century chronicler Lucas Fernández de Piedrahita, considered unreliable.

There were four muisca confederations of chiefdoms, and independent territories in the north-west. According to the Austro-Colombian anthropologist Gerardo Reichel-Dolmatoff, the north-west chiefdoms offered an idea of the state of muisca organisation prior to the expansion of some chiefdoms to form confederations. The chiefdom of Sogamoso or Iraca was related to the northern sun-cult around Sadigue, a parallel figure to Bochica. According to some tales, the chiefs of Iraca were given religious rights by Bochica at his death. The chiefdoms of Sogamoso and Duitama were described as independent of Tunja in colonial documents. The position of the Zipa (chief of the Bogotá confederation) was such that not even the members of the nobility dared to look him in the face, and it is said if the Zipa needed to spit, someone would hold out a piece of rich cloth for him to spit on, because it would be sacrilegious for anything so precious as his saliva to touch the ground. Whoever held the cloth (all the while carefully looking the other way) then carried it off to be reverently disposed of. The histories and battles reported by the colonial-era writers called Spanish Chroniclers were likely exaggerated or modified, but contain, according to Martha Herrera Angel, true events. On the other hand, Carl Henrik Langebaek finds them to be moral stories told in the form of mythical narratives and misinterpreted by the Spaniards.

The Zipa was also given the responsibility of offering gold to the gods. He would cover himself with gold and float out on a royal barge to the middle of the sacred Lake Guatavita, where he would offer up golden trinkets. This is widely believed to be how the legend of El Dorado started.

When Gonzalo Jiménez de Quesada arrived in the Muisca territories the ruling Zipa was Bogotá and the Zaque (chief of Tunja) was Eucaneme.

=== "Zaque" (term of disputed validity) ===
Muisca rulers of Hunza (Zaques)
Image	Name	Start	End	Details
	Hunzahúa	?	1470	Founded city of Hunza, now Tunja
	Michuá	1470	1490	Died in the Battle of Chocontá
	Quemuenchatocha	1490	1537	Ruled when the Spanish arrived in modern-day Colombia
	Aquiminzaque	1537	1539	Last Muisca ruler

=== Zipa ===
Muisca rulers of Bacatá (Zipas)
Image	Name	Start	End	Details
	Meicuchuca	1450	1470	According to legend slept with a snake
	Saguamanchica	1470	1490	Died in the Battle of Chocontá
	Nemequene	1490	1514	Introduced the brutal Nemequene Code
	Tisquesusa	1514	1537	Ruled when the Spanish arrived in Colombia
	Sagipa	1537	1539	Last southern Muisca ruler

=== Other rulers ===
Muisca rulers of Tundama, Iraca and Turmequé
Image	Name	Start	End	Details
	Tundama		−1539	Last ruler of Tundama
	Sugamuxi		−1539	Last iraca of Sugamuxi
	Nompanim			Second-last iraca of Sugamuxi
	Diego de Torres y Moyachoque	1571	1590	Mestizo cacique of Turmequé

== See also ==
- Spanish conquest of the Muisca
- Muisca
- Muisca Confederation
