= Guecha warrior =

East Andean highland warrior

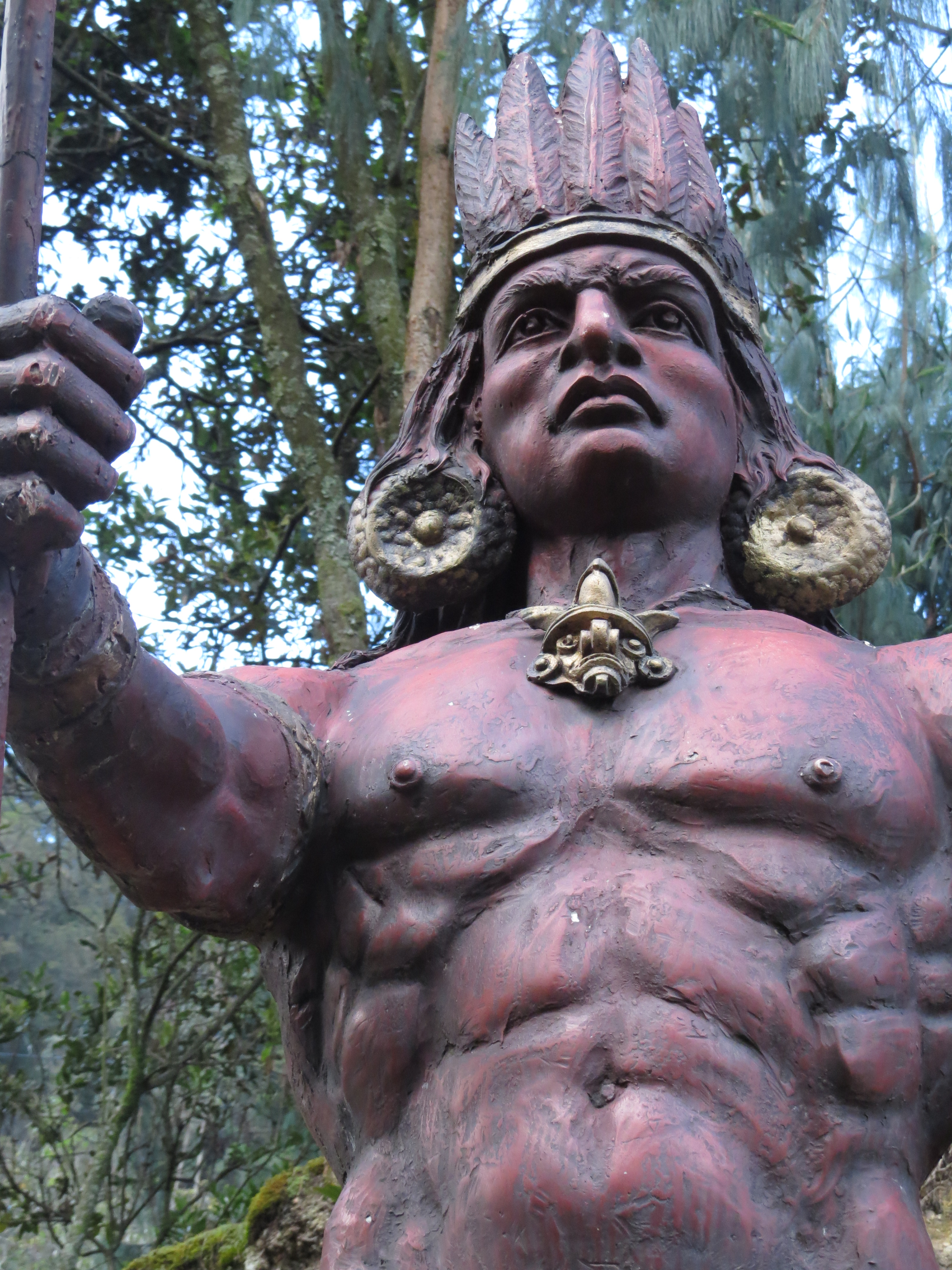
Statue of a Guecha warrior

Guecha warriors (Spanish: güechas or gueches) were warriors of the Muisca Confederation in the Tenza Valley, Ubaque valley and Altiplano Cundiboyacense in the pre-Columbian era. The Guecha warrior was chosen for his merit in attitude and physique rather than by class. He was recognised by his unique status in society and his adornment with gold, feathers and inks.

== Etymology ==
In the Chibcha language spoken by the Muisca people, the word Güechá has a number of possible meanings. The syllable güe may mean "people", "I killed", "house" or "place". The syllable chá may mean "man" or "male". Hence, güechá may mean "man of the house", "man of the people", or "man who causes death". Güechá may also mean "the brother from another mother" or "uncle".

== Selection process ==
The güechá warriors were an elite troop of Hamza soldiers. The warriors were chosen from the soldiers of the zipa (ruler of the southern Muisca Confederation). A noble lineage was not required for selection. Rather, exemplary service as a warrior may provide entry to the noble classes as a cacicas. The Güechá had to be courageous. They had to be able to work around rigid societal rules and those of an absolute monarchy. The güechá position was not hereditary; selection was only on merit.

== Features ==
The warriors were a privileged group, esteemed for their toughness, and bravery. Their endeavours earned them rewards such as cacicazgos (chiefdoms). Those who fell in battle received posthumous honors. For instance, certain balsams were applied to their bodies and their bodies were carried on the shoulders of their fellow warriors. It was believed the presence of a dead warrior's body could infuse other warriors with life so they might fight again.

== Appearance ==
The Franciscan friar Pedro Simón (1578 – 1620) described the warriors as "men of great physique, bodies, bold, loose, determined and vigilant". Lucas Fernández de Piedrahita (1624 – 1688) a Catholic prelate described the warriors as "brave and determined men, with big beautiful physiques, lightness and skill". Unlike the common men, the warriors wore their hair very short and were allowed to wear gold beads and ornaments through edge-pierced ears, nose and lips.

The warriors carried clubs, darts, spears, bows and arrows, and slings. They took Panche and Calima slaves with them to war. The men went into combat with curled plumes of parrot feathers, and wide ribbons of fine gold encrusted with emeralds. They wore bracelets and fine coral and gold beads. Inks and Jagua tattoos were also used.

== See also ==
- History of Colombia
- Muisca warfare
- Eagle warrior, Aztec
- Jaguar warrior, Aztec
- Tairona
- Zenú

== Bibliography ==
- Henderson, Hope; Ostler, Nicholas (2005), "Muisca settlement organization and chiefly authority at Suta, Valle de Leyva, Colombia: A critical appraisal of native concepts of house for studies of complex societies", Journal of Anthropological Archaeology, 24 (2), Elsevier: 148–178, doi:10.1016/j.jaa.2005.01.002, ISSN 0278-4165
