= Lucas Fernández de Piedrahita =

Catholic bishop (1624–1688)

Most Reverend Lucas Fernández de Piedrahita
- Bishop of Panama
- Church: Catholic Church
- Diocese: Diocese of Panamá
- In office: 1676–1688
- Predecessor: Antonio de León y Becerra
- Successor: Diego Ladrón de Guevara
- Previous post: Bishop of Santa Marta (1668–1676)

Orders
- Consecration: 1669 by Antonio Sanz Lozano

Personal details
- Born: 1624 Santa Fe de Bogotá
- Died: March 29, 1688 (age 64) Panama City
- Parents: Domingo Hernández de Soto Piedrahita (father); Catalina de Collantes (mother)

Lucas Fernández de Piedrahita (1624, Bogotá – March 29, 1688) was a Spanish Neogranadine Roman Catholic prelate who served as the Bishop of Panamá (1676–1688) and the Bishop of Santa Marta (1668–1676). He authored the Historia general de las conquistas de; Nuevo Reyno de Granada, a la S.C.R.M. de D. Carlos Segundo, 1688, which has shaped colonial era and modern understandings of the Muisca indigenous people.

== Biography ==
Lucas Fernández de Soto Piedrahita was born in Santa Fe de Bogotá as son of Domingo Hernández de Soto Piedrahita and Catalina de Collantes. He had one brother and two sisters: Gregorio Hernández de Collantes, María Sayago and Maria Fernández de Piedrahita and his mother was of Inca descent. On February 27, 1668, he was appointed by the King of Spain and confirmed by Pope Clement IX as Bishop of Santa Marta. In 1669, he was consecrated bishop by Antonio Sanz Lozano, Bishop of Cartagena. On November 16, 1676, he was appointed by the King of Spain and confirmed by Pope Innocent XI as Bishop of Panamá. He served as Bishop of Panamá until his death on March 29, 1688. He was the principal consecrator of Sancho de Andrade de Figueroa, Bishop of Ayacucho o Huamanga.

== Muisca ==
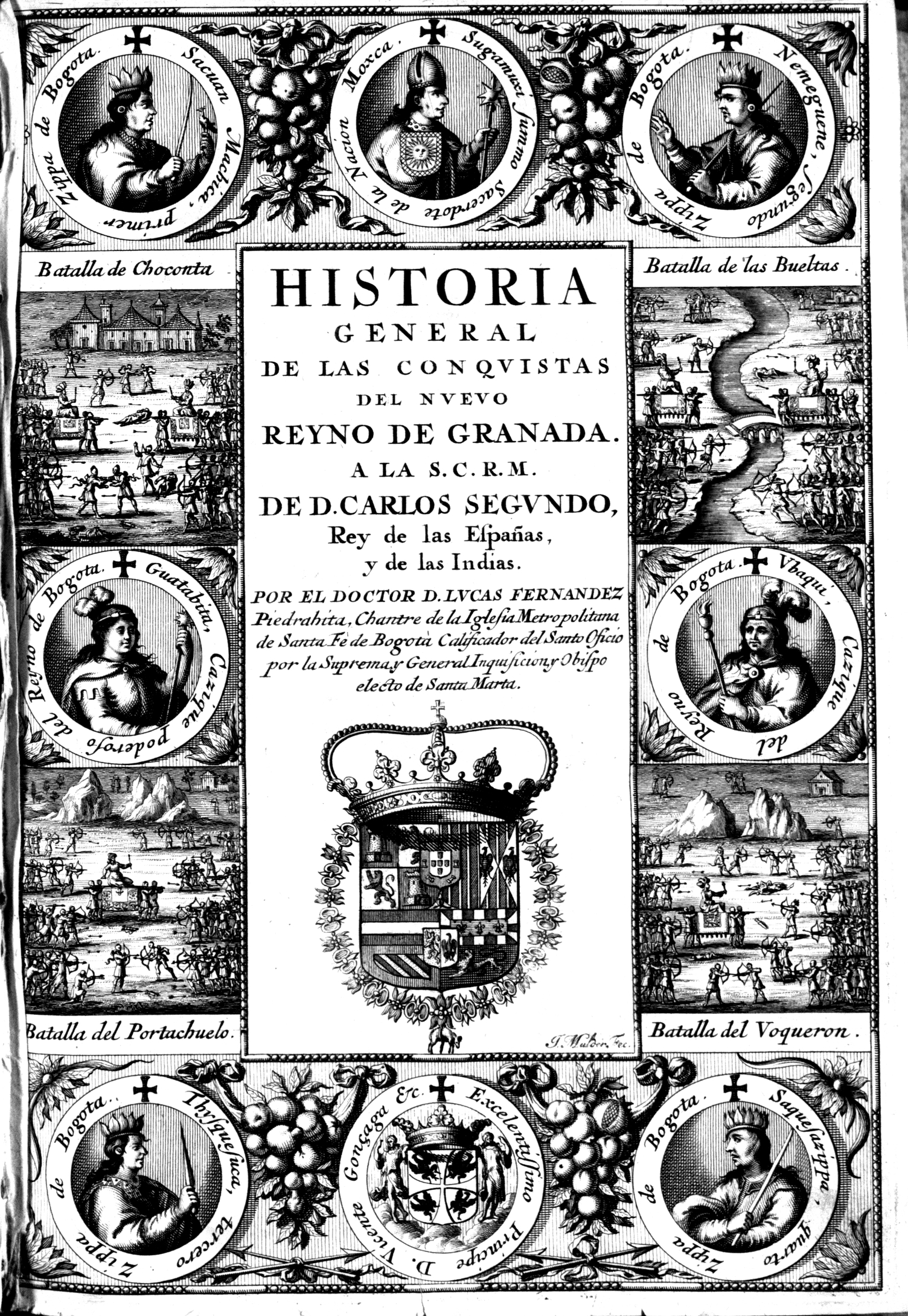
Lucas Fernández de Piedrahita, Historia general de las conquistas del Nuevo Reyno de Granada, 1688

Fernández de Piedrahita has contributed extensively on the knowledge about the Muisca, the inhabitants of Altiplano Cundiboyacense before the arrival of the Spanish.

== See also ==
- List of Muisca scholars

== External links and additional sources ==
- Cheney, David M. "Archdiocese of Panamá". Catholic-Hierarchy.org. (for Chronology of Bishops) ^{[self-published]}
- Chow, Gabriel. "Metropolitan Archdiocese of Panamá". GCatholic.org. (for Chronology of Bishops) ^{[self-published]}
- Cheney, David M. "Diocese of Santa Marta". Catholic-Hierarchy.org. (for Chronology of Bishops) ^{[self-published]}
- Chow, Gabriel. "Metropolitan Diocese of Santa Marta (Colombia)". GCatholic.org. (for Chronology of Bishops) ^{[self-published]}

Religious titles
Preceded by Melchor Liñán y Cisneros	Bishop of Santa Marta; 1668–1676	Succeeded by Diego de Baños y Sotomayor
Preceded by Antonio de León y Becerra	Bishop of Panamá; 1676–1688	Succeeded by Diego Ladrón de Guevara
