= Pasca =

- Town and municipality
- Pasca's church and museum façade

- Flag Seal

- Location of the municipality and town of Pasca in the Department of Cundinamarca

- Location in Colombia
- Coordinates: 4°18′27″N 74°18′3″W
- Country: Colombia
- Department: Cundinamarca
- Province: Sumapaz Province
- Founded: 15 July 1537
- Founder: Juan de Céspedes

Government
  - Type: Municipality
  - Mayor: Jonathan Alfonso Parra Forero. (2024-Present)

Area
  - Town and municipality: 264.24 km^{2} (102.02 sq mi)
  - Urban: 0.27 km^{2} (0.10 sq mi)
- Elevation: 2,180 m (7,150 ft)

Population (2015)
  - Town and municipality: 12,175
  - Density: 46.076/km^{2} (119.34/sq mi)
  - Urban: 2,841
  - Urban density: 11,000/km^{2} (27,000/sq mi)
- Time zone: UTC-5 (Colombian Standard Time)
- Website: Official website

Pasca is a town and municipality in the Cundinamarca department of Colombia located in the Andes. It belongs to the Sumapaz Province. Pasca is situated on the Altiplano Cundiboyacense at a distance of 71 kilometres (44 mi) from the capital Bogotá. It borders Fusagasugá, Sibaté and Soacha in the north, Bogotá D.C. in the north and east, Arbeláez in the south and Fusagasugá in the west. Is the entrance to the Páramo del Sumapaz, the biggest ecosystem in its genre in the world. The urban center is located at an altitude of 2,180 metres (7,150 ft) and the altitude ranges from 2,000 metres (6,600 ft) to 3,500 metres (11,500 ft).

== Etymology ==
Pasca in the Chibcha language means "father's enclosure", according to Acosta Ortegón.

== History ==
Pasca in the time before the Spanish conquest was inhabited by the Muisca, organized in their Muisca Confederation. The southern Muisca territories were ruled from Muyquytá, the current capital. On April 6, 1536 conquistadors Gonzalo Jiménez de Quesada and his brother started the strenuous march into the inner highlands of Colombia. With 209 men he arrived on March 12, 1537, in Guachetá. From there he led his army to conquer the villages of the Muisca on the Bogotá savanna.

One of his captains, Juan de Céspedes, reached Pasca in July 1537, founding modern Pasca on July 15. It was the last village of the Muisca to be conquered before heading south into the domain of the Sutagao.

== Economy ==
Main economical activities in Pasca are livestock farming and agriculture, predominantly papa criolla, other potatoes, peas, onions, bunching onions, tree tomatoes, beans, carrots, cabbage, lettuce, tomatoes, corn, blackberries, coriander and the Colombian fruits gulupa and curuba.

== Archeology ==
The famous Muisca raft, traditionally interpreted as representing the ritual of El Dorado, was found in Pasca in 1969. The raft is now part of the Gold Museum collection in Bogotá.

The town contains an archaeological museum and a natural history museum.

== Famous pasqueños ==
- Colombian poet and politician Adolfo León Gómez was born in Pasca and his grandmother, poet Josefa Acevedo de Gomez, lived and wrote her work here
- Native Zoratama lived in Pasca

Ivan Ramiro Sosa cyclist winner of multiple races.

== Climate ==
Climate data for Pasca, elevation 2,256 m (7,402 ft), (1981–2010)
Month	Jan	Feb	Mar	Apr	May	Jun	Jul	Aug	Sep	Oct	Nov	Dec	Year
Mean daily maximum °C (°F)	19.3 (66.7)	19.4 (66.9)	19.5 (67.1)	19.3 (66.7)	19.5 (67.1)	19.4 (66.9)	19.2 (66.6)	19.5 (67.1)	19.7 (67.5)	19.4 (66.9)	19.4 (66.9)	19.4 (66.9)	19.5 (67.1)
Daily mean °C (°F)	15.7 (60.3)	15.7 (60.3)	15.9 (60.6)	15.9 (60.6)	15.9 (60.6)	15.8 (60.4)	15.6 (60.1)	15.7 (60.3)	15.9 (60.6)	15.8 (60.4)	15.7 (60.3)	15.8 (60.4)	15.8 (60.4)
Mean daily minimum °C (°F)	10.3 (50.5)	10.5 (50.9)	11.2 (52.2)	11.6 (52.9)	11.6 (52.9)	11.4 (52.5)	11.1 (52.0)	11.1 (52.0)	10.9 (51.6)	11.0 (51.8)	11.1 (52.0)	10.6 (51.1)	11.0 (51.8)
Average precipitation mm (inches)	53.3 (2.10)	53.9 (2.12)	92.0 (3.62)	102.1 (4.02)	84.0 (3.31)	51.0 (2.01)	45.4 (1.79)	40.9 (1.61)	57.0 (2.24)	106.9 (4.21)	113.3 (4.46)	61.1 (2.41)	860.7 (33.89)
Average precipitation days	11	12	15	18	21	19	20	16	16	20	18	13	191
Average relative humidity (%)	84	85	86	87	87	87	86	85	85	86	87	85	86
Mean monthly sunshine hours	139.5	118.6	99.2	81.0	86.8	96.0	93.0	102.3	96.0	93.0	90.0	124.0	1,219.4
Mean daily sunshine hours	4.5	4.2	3.2	2.7	2.8	3.2	3.0	3.3	3.2	3.0	3.0	4.0	3.3
Source: Instituto de Hidrologia Meteorologia y Estudios Ambientales

== Gallery ==
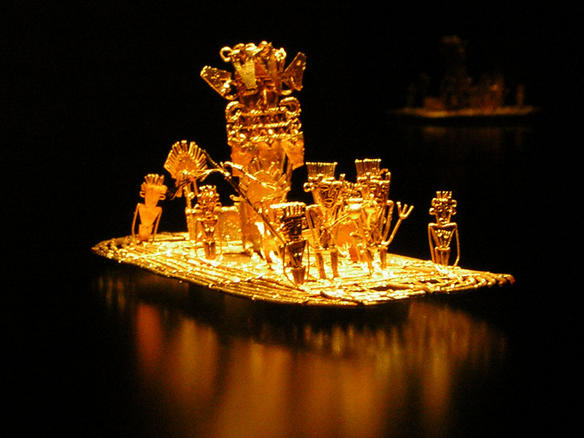
Muisca raft found in Pasca, depicting El Dorado ritual

== See also ==
- El Dorado
- Juan de Céspedes
- Archeological Museum of Pasca, Sumapaz National Park
