= Tibacuy =

- Municipality and town
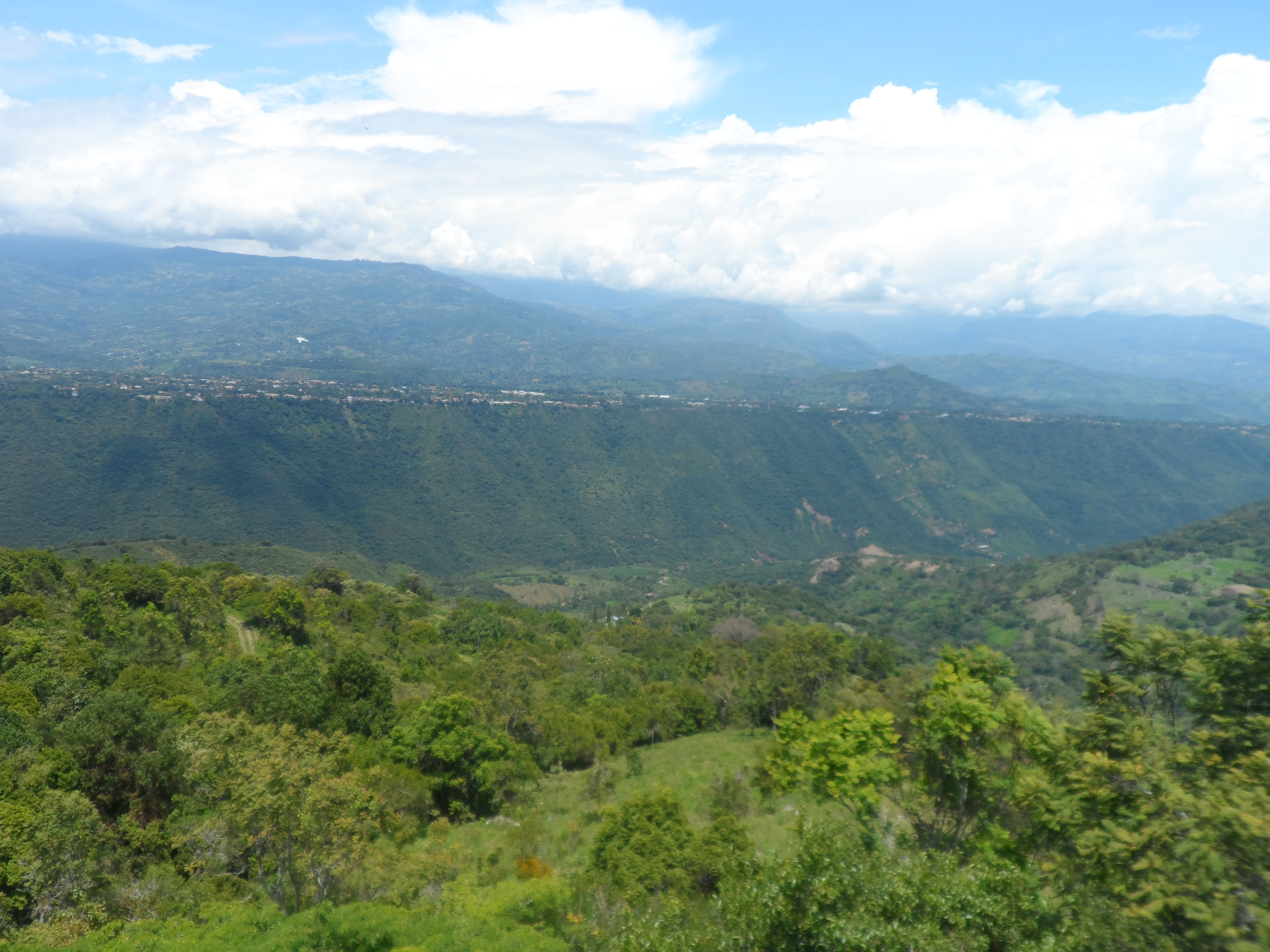
- View from Cumaca, rural part of Tibacuy

- Flag Coat of arms

- Location of the municipality and town inside Cundinamarca Department of Colombia

- Location in Colombia
- Coordinates: 4°20′50″N 74°27′9″W
- Country: Colombia
- Department: Cundinamarca
- Province: Sumapaz Province
- Founded: 17 February 1592
- Founder: Bernardino de Albornoz

Government
  - Mayor: Eduar Javier Serrano Orjuela (2016–2019)

Area
  - Municipality and town: 84.4 km^{2} (32.6 sq mi)
  - Urban: 0.25 km^{2} (0.097 sq mi)
- Elevation: 1,647 m (5,404 ft)

Population (2015)
  - Municipality and town: 4,828
  - Density: 57.2/km^{2} (148/sq mi)
  - Urban: 523
- Time zone: UTC-5 (Colombia Standard Time)
- Website: Official website

Tibacuy is a municipality and town of Colombia in the department of Cundinamarca, in Sumapaz Province. Tibacuy is situated south of the Altiplano Cundiboyacense in the Eastern Ranges of the Colombian Andes at 87 kilometres (54 mi) southeast of the capital Bogotá.

== Climate ==
Climate data for Tibacuy (Tibacuy Gja), elevation 1,550 m (5,090 ft), (1971–2000)
Month	Jan	Feb	Mar	Apr	May	Jun	Jul	Aug	Sep	Oct	Nov	Dec	Year
Mean daily maximum °C (°F)	24.4 (75.9)	24.2 (75.6)	24.0 (75.2)	23.6 (74.5)	23.5 (74.3)	23.7 (74.7)	24.1 (75.4)	24.6 (76.3)	24.4 (75.9)	23.4 (74.1)	23.0 (73.4)	23.4 (74.1)	23.8 (74.8)
Daily mean °C (°F)	19.6 (67.3)	19.5 (67.1)	19.5 (67.1)	19.3 (66.7)	19.2 (66.6)	19.1 (66.4)	19.2 (66.6)	19.5 (67.1)	19.6 (67.3)	19.1 (66.4)	18.9 (66.0)	18.9 (66.0)	19.3 (66.7)
Mean daily minimum °C (°F)	15.3 (59.5)	15.3 (59.5)	15.7 (60.3)	15.7 (60.3)	15.6 (60.1)	15.3 (59.5)	14.9 (58.8)	15.2 (59.4)	15.3 (59.5)	15.3 (59.5)	15.2 (59.4)	15.0 (59.0)	15.3 (59.5)
Average precipitation mm (inches)	77.3 (3.04)	88.2 (3.47)	124.5 (4.90)	120.9 (4.76)	89.0 (3.50)	50.2 (1.98)	38.2 (1.50)	39.7 (1.56)	67.9 (2.67)	128.0 (5.04)	145.7 (5.74)	94.9 (3.74)	1,064.5 (41.91)
Average precipitation days	10	12	15	16	17	14	13	13	15	19	18	12	172
Average relative humidity (%)	78	79	80	82	83	79	75	73	73	79	83	80	79
Mean monthly sunshine hours	161.2	124.4	114.7	102.0	114.7	120.0	133.3	124.0	123.0	120.9	117.0	158.1	1,513.3
Mean daily sunshine hours	5.2	4.4	3.7	3.4	3.7	4.0	4.3	4.0	4.1	3.9	3.9	5.1	4.1
Source: Instituto de Hidrologia Meteorologia y Estudios Ambientales

== Etymology ==
In the Chibcha language of the Muisca and Panche, Tibacuy means "official chief".

== History ==
The area of Tibacuy was inhabited by the Muisca and the Panche with the Sutagao living to the southeast. The present town centre is situated at a lower altitude than the original indigenous village. Modern Tibacuy was founded between 13th and 17th of February 1592 by Bernardino de Albornoz.

== Economy ==
Main economical activity of Tibacuy is agriculture, predominantly coffee, bananas, tomatoes and blackberries.

== Archaeology ==
In Cumaca, rural part of Tibacuy, petroglyphs have been found.

== Gallery ==
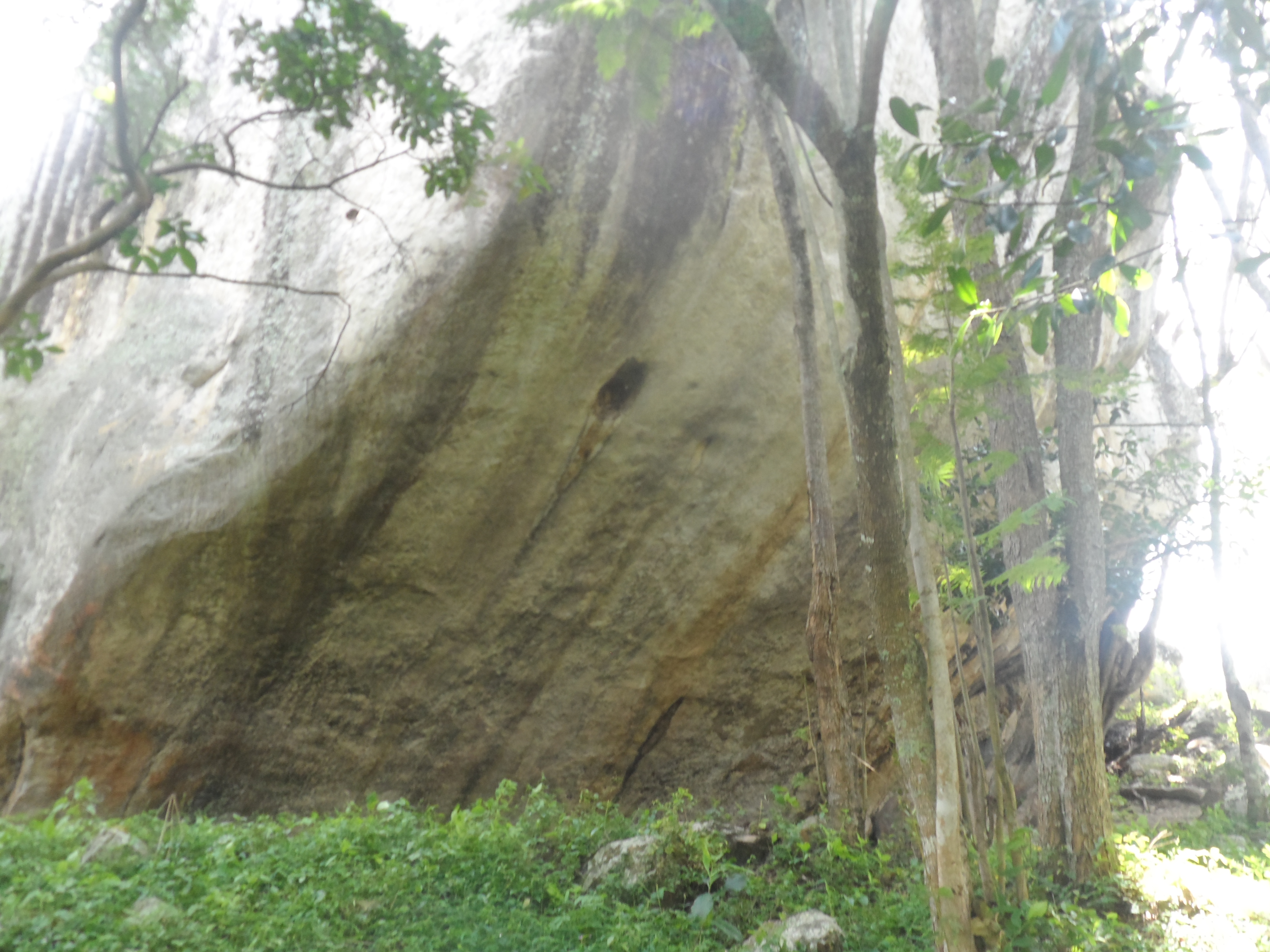
Location of petroglyphs in Cumaca, Tibacuy

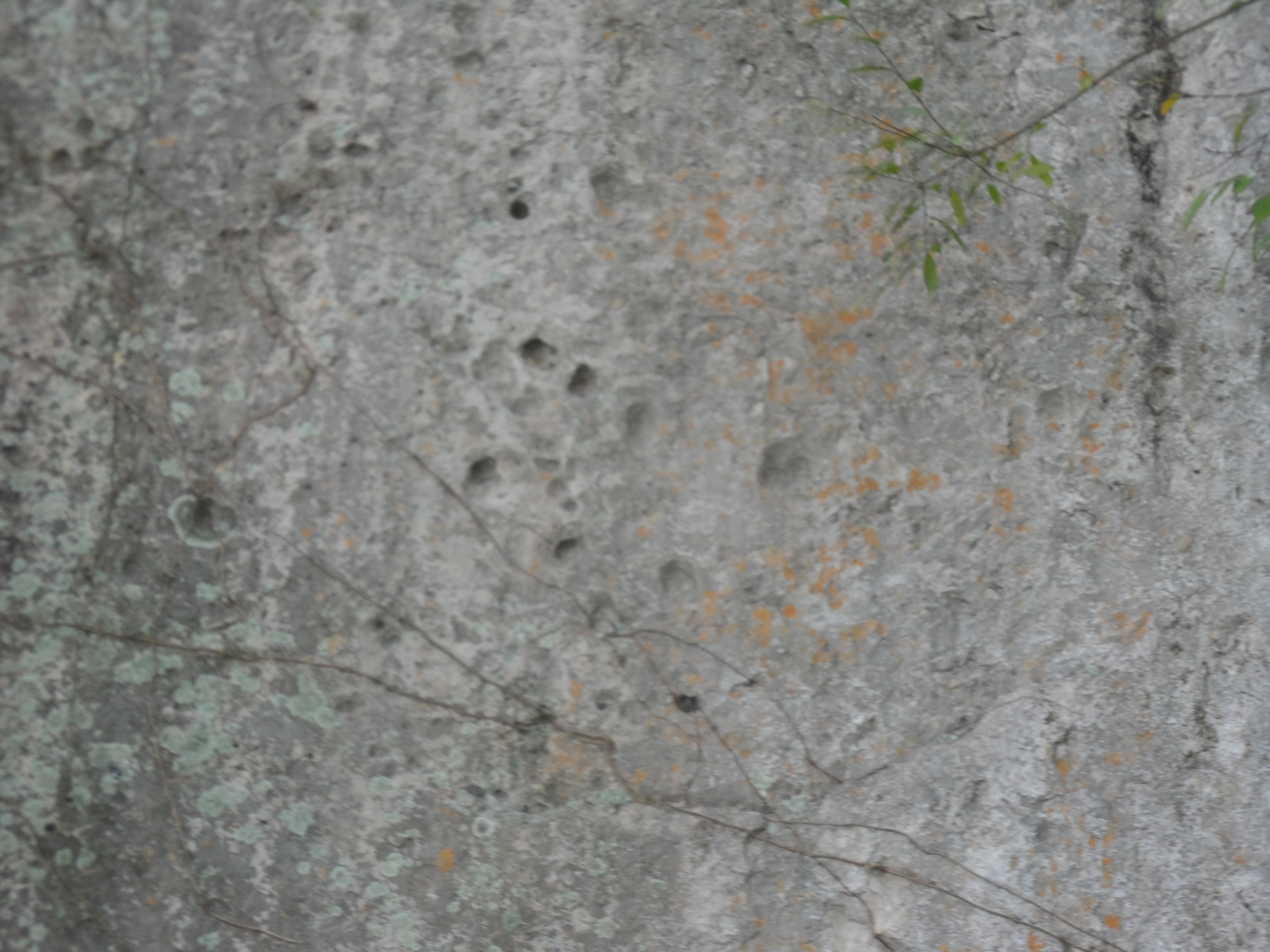
Petroglyphs

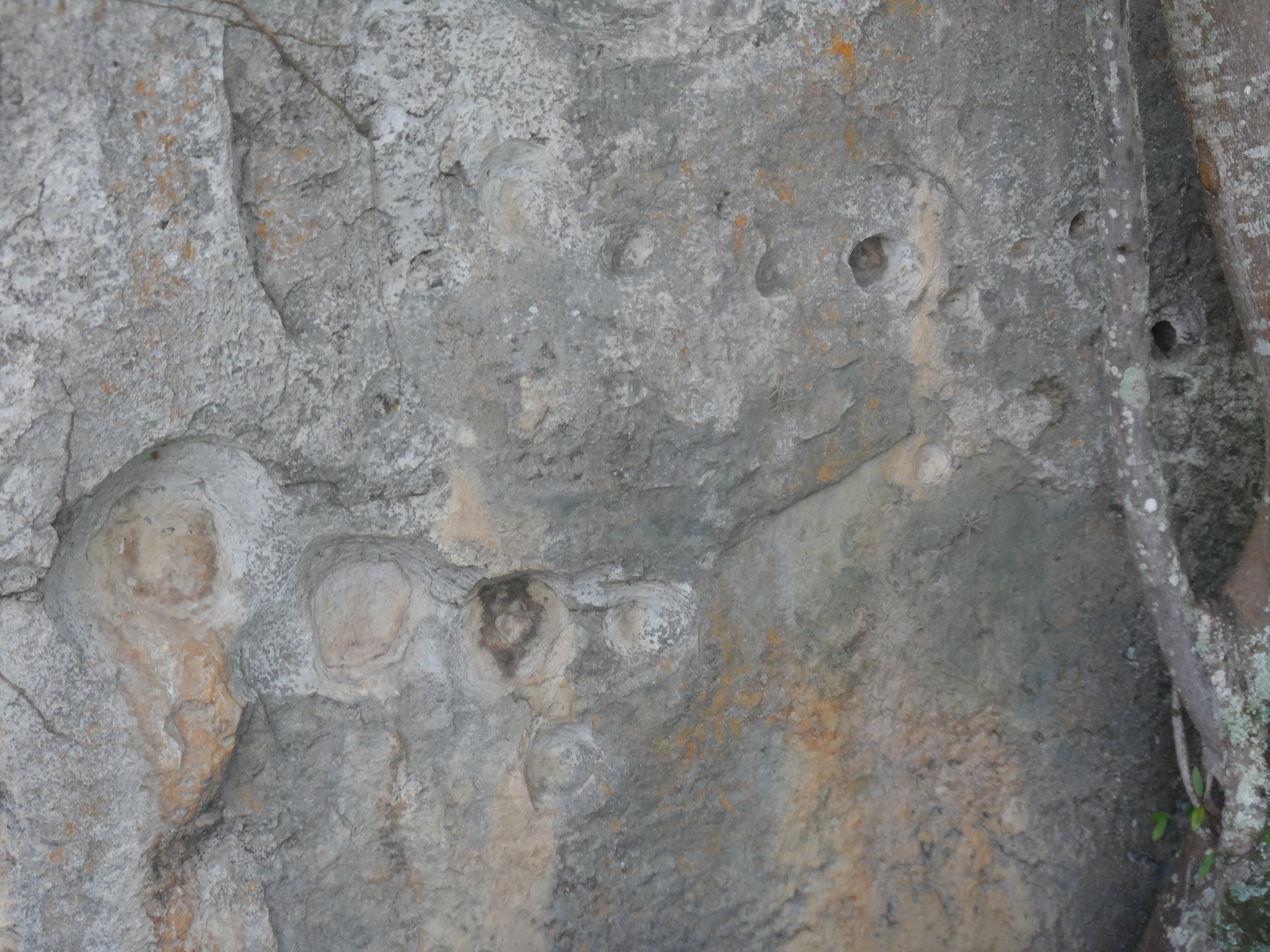
Petroglyphs

== See also ==
- Muisca
- Panche
- Sutagao
