= Peperomia veneciana =

Scientific classification
- Kingdom: Plantae
- Clade: Embryophytes
- Clade: Tracheophytes
- Clade: Angiosperms
- Clade: Magnoliids
- Order: Piperales
- Family: Piperaceae
- Genus: Peperomia
- Species: P. veneciana

Binomial name
- Peperomia veneciana Trel. & Yunck.

Species of epiphyte

Peperomia veneciana is a species of epiphyte from the genus Peperomia. They primarily grow in wet tropical biomes. It was discovered by William Trelease and Truman G. Yuncker in 1950.

== Etymology ==
veneciana came from the locality "Venecia-pandi". This refers to the species being discovered in the locality.

== Distribution ==
Peperomia veneciana is native to Colombia. Specimens can be found at 1050 meters.

- Colombia
  - Cundinamarca
    - Venecia-pandi
