= Arbeláez =

- Municipality and town
- Flag Coat of arms

- Location of the town of Arbaláez in the Department of Cundinamarca, Colombia

- Location in Colombia
- Coordinates: 4°16′21″N 74°24′54″W
- Country: Colombia
- Department: Cundinamarca

Area
  - Total: 152.16 km^{2} (58.75 sq mi)
- Elevation: 1,379 m (4,524 ft)

Population (2015)
  - Total: 12,292
  - Density: 80.783/km^{2} (209.23/sq mi)
- Time zone: UTC-5 (Colombia Standard Time)
- Website: www.arbelaez-cundinamarca.gov.co

Arbeláez (Spanish pronunciation: [aɾβeˈlaes]) is a town and municipality in the Cundinamarca Department, Colombia. It borders Fusagasugá, Pasca and other municipalities of the Sumapaz Province. Arbeláez is recognized as a quiet and friendly city of Colombia. It is known for its touristic interest due to mountain landscape, recreation centers, walking trails, ecotourism and sites presenting multiple opportunities for visitors.

== See also ==
- Arbelaez (surname)
