= Muisca =

Indigenous people of Colombia

Muysca
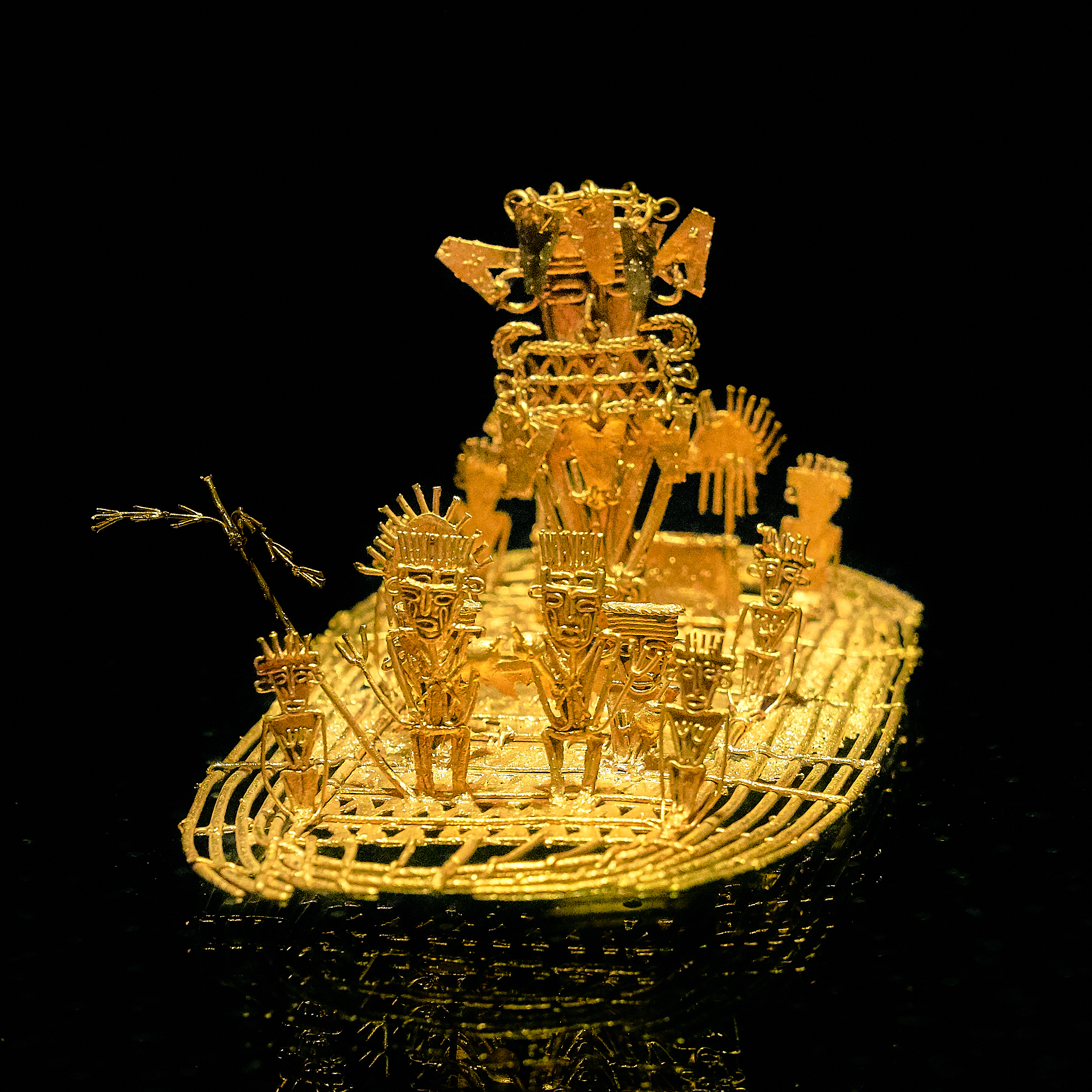
- Muisca raft (1200–1500 CE) representation of the initiation of the new zipa at the lake of Guatavita

Total population
- 2 million (estimate) (Pre-Spanish and early conquest era)
- 14,051 (2005 census)
- 11,265 (2018 census)

Regions with significant populations
- Altiplano Cundiboyacense, Colombia

Languages
- Muysccubun (Chibcha), Colombian Spanish

Religion
- Muisca religion, Catholicism

Related ethnic groups
- Guane, Lache, U'wa, Tegua, Guayupe, Sutagao, Panche, Muzo

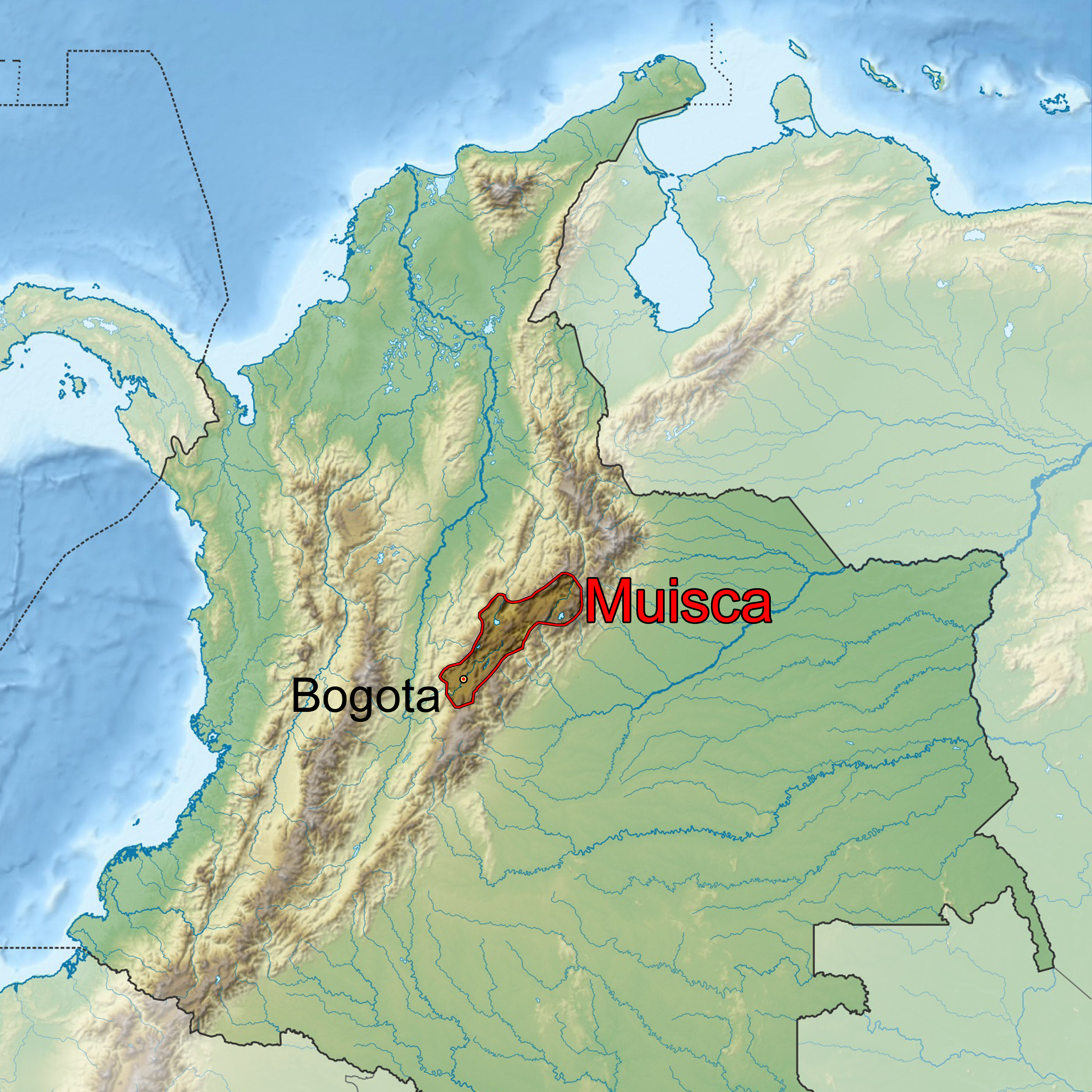
Location of Muisca in Colombia.

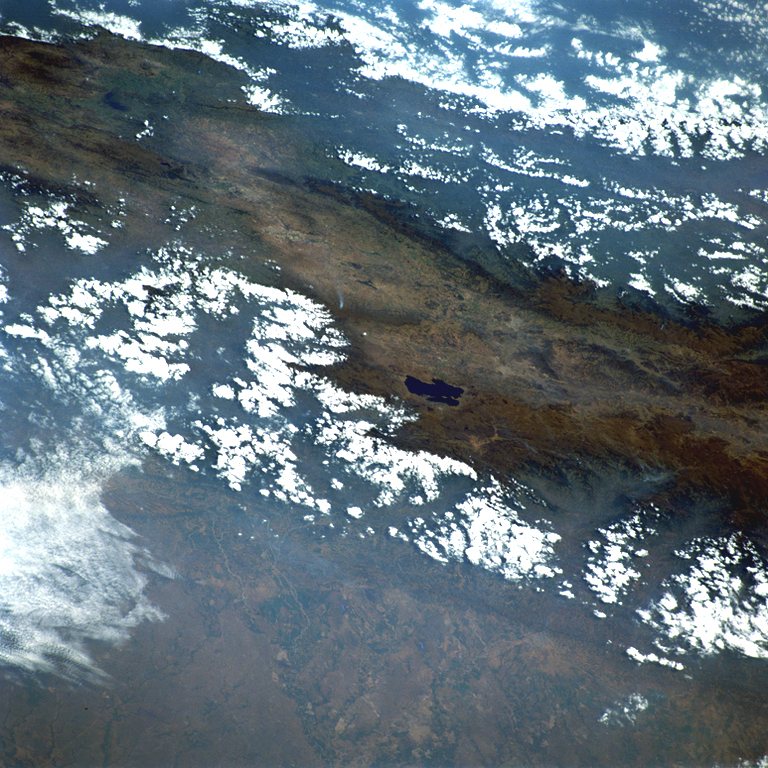
View of the Eastern Ranges of the Andean natural region Lake Tota is clearly visible

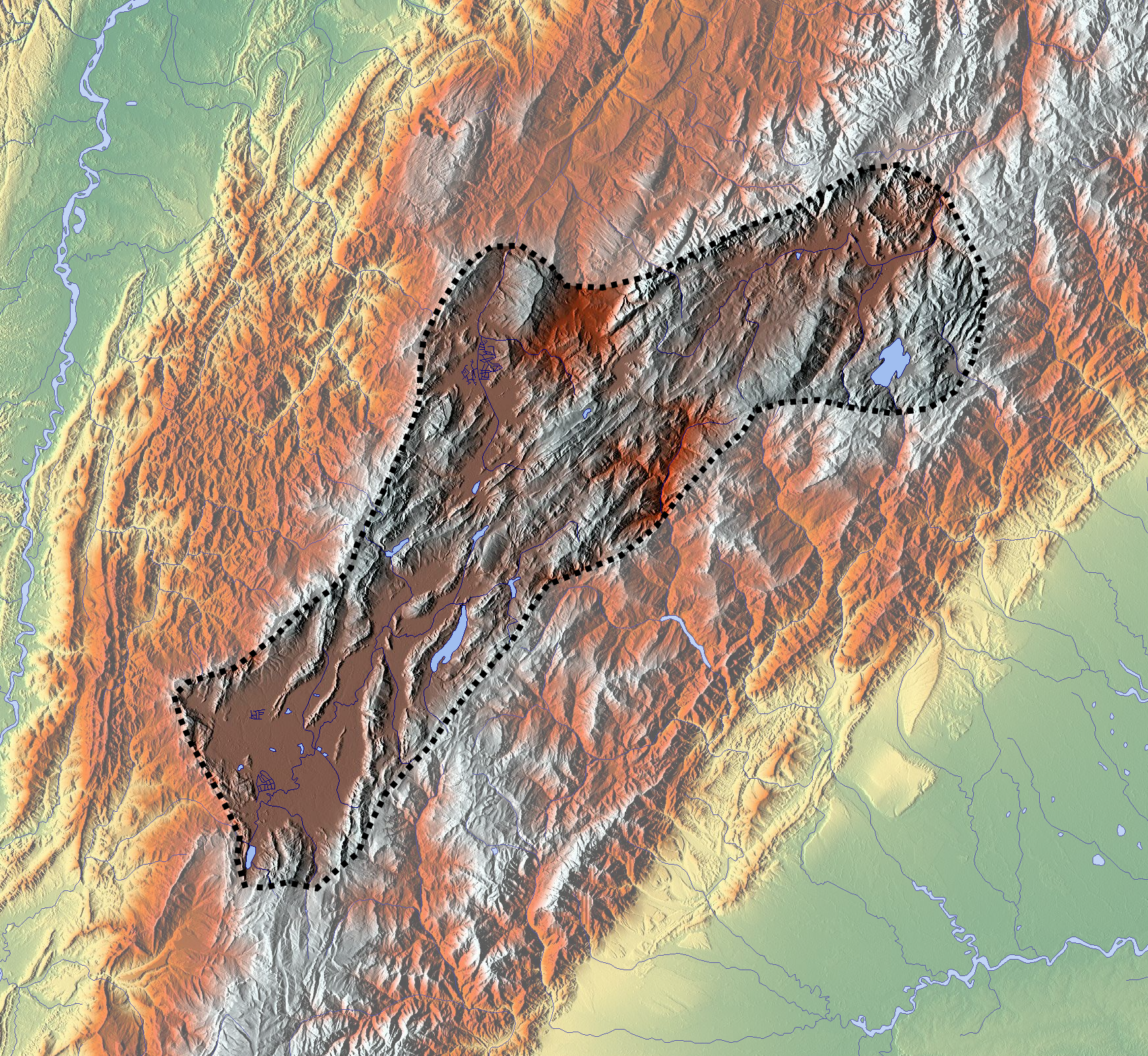
The Altiplano Cundiboyacense in the Eastern Ranges; territory of the Muisca

Southwestern Altiplano; Bogotá savanna, territory of the southern mosca (zipa)

The Muisca (also called the Chibcha more loosely) were an indigenous pre-Columbian culture and ethnic group of the Altiplano Cundiboyacense before the Spanish colonization of the Americas and later colonial communities, many of whose customs lasted up to the beginning of the 19th century and Colombian independence. The Muisca and their descendants today are among the indigenous peoples of Colombia in a process of cultural re-definition and revitalization. They traditionally spoke Muysccubun, a language of the Chibchan language family, also called Muysca, Mosca and Chibcha, which is part of an important revival effort. The first known contact with Europeans in the region was in 1537 during the Spanish conquest of New Granada.

In New Spain, Spanish clerics and civil officials had a major impact on the Muisca, attempting to Christianize and incorporate them into the Spanish Empire as subjects.

Postconquest Muisca culture underwent significant changes due to the establishment of the New Kingdom of Granada. Sources for the Muisca are far less abundant than for the Aztec Empire of Mesoamerica or the Inca Empire and their incorporation to the Spanish Empire during the colonial era. In the New Kingdom of Granada and into the colonial era, the Muisca became "the official 'tribe' of the Colombian nation" and "a local version of the Aztecs and Incas". Recent scholarship on the Muisca by archeologists, anthropologists, and historians is revising the understanding of the Muiscas' prehispanic and colonial era past.

== History of the Muisca ==
Subgroupings were identified chiefly by their allegiances to three great Muisca rulers: the hoa in Hunza, ruling a territory roughly covering modern southern and northeastern Boyacá and southern Santander; the psihipqua in Muyquytá and encompassing most of modern Cundinamarca, the western Llanos; and the iraca, religious ruler of Suamox and modern northeastern Boyacá and southwestern Santander.

The territory of the Muisca spanned an area of around 25,000 km^{2} (9,700 sq mi) from the north of Boyacá to the Sumapaz Páramo and from the summits to the western portion of the Eastern Ranges. Their territory bordered the lands of the Panche in the west, the Muzo in the northwest, the Guane in the north, the Lache in the northeast, the Achagua in the east, and the Sutagao in the south.

At the time of the Spaniard invasion, the area had a large population, although the precise number of inhabitants is not known. Estimates vary from 1 million to over 3 million inhabitants. Their economy was based on agriculture, salt mining, trading, metalworking, and manufacturing.

Due to Spanish colonization, the population of the Muisca drastically decreased and assimilated into the general population. The descendants of the Muisca are often found in rural municipalities including Cota, Chía, Tenjo, Suba, Engativá, Tocancipá, Gachancipá, and Ubaté. A census by the Ministry of Interior Affairs in 2005 reports a total of 14,051 Muisca people in Colombia.

Much of the historical knowledge about the Muisca comes from the testimony of conquisadores and colonists: Gonzalo Jiménez de Quesada; Spanish poet, soldier, and Catholic priest Juan de Castellanos (16th century); Bishop Lucas Fernández de Piedrahita; and the Franciscan Pedro Simón (17th century).

More recently, Javier Ocampo López and Gonzalo Correal Urrego have contributed notable scholarship.

Knowledge of events up until 1450 is mainly derived from mythological contexts. Thanks to the Chronicles of the West Indies, we have descriptions of the final period of Muisca's history before the Spanish arrival.

=== Archeology ===
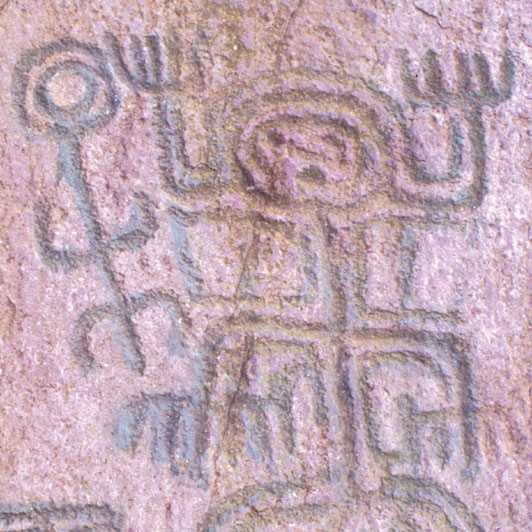
Petroglyphs of El Abra (~11,000 BCE)

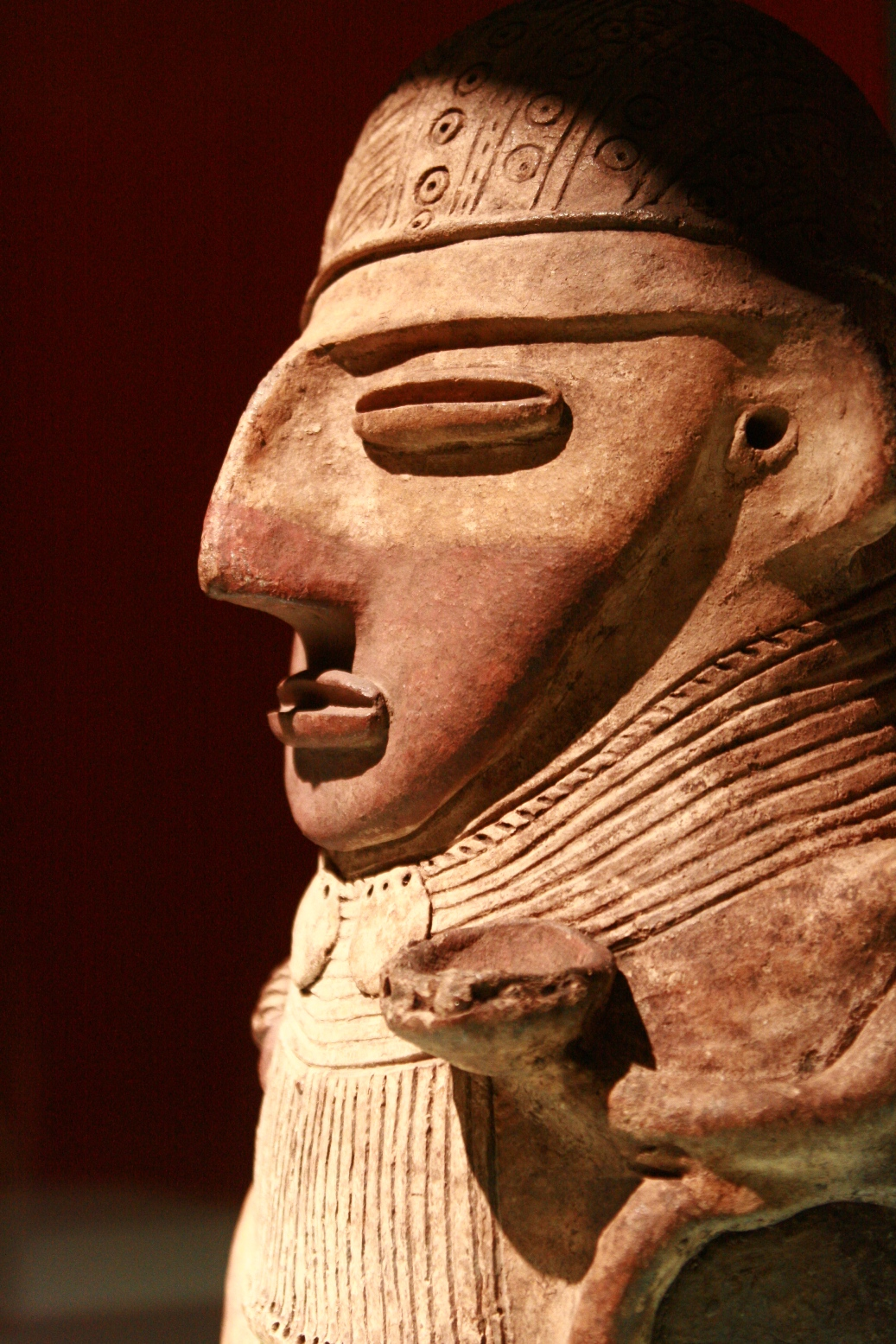
A Muiscan ceramic figure, 600–1600 AD

Excavations in the Altiplano Cundiboyacense (the highlands of Cundinamarca and Boyacá departments) show evidence of human activity since the Archaic Period at the beginning of the Holocene. Colombia has one of the most ancient archaeological sites of the Americas: El Abra, which is estimated to be approximately 13,000 years old. Other archaeological traces in the region of the Altiplano Cundiboyacense have led scholars to talk about an El Abra Culture: In Tibitó, tools and other lithic artifacts date to 9740 BCE; on the Bogotá savanna, especially at Tequendama Falls, other lithic tools dated a millennium later were found that belonged to specialized hunters. Human skeletons were found dating back to 5000 BCE, and an analysis demonstrated that the people were members of the El Abra culture.

=== Muisca era ===
Scholars agree that the group identified as Muisca migrated to the Altiplano Cundiboyacense in the Formative stage (between 1000 BCE and 500 CE), as shown by evidence found at Aguazuque and Soacha. Like the other formative-era cultures of America, the Muiscas were transitioning between being hunter-gatherers and becoming sedentary farmers. Around 1500 BCE, groups of agrarians with ceramic traditions came to the region from the lowlands. They had permanent housing and stationary camps, and worked the salty water to extract salt. In Zipacón, there is evidence of agriculture and ceramics; the oldest settlement of the highlands dates to 1270 BCE. Between 800 BCE and 500 BCE, a second wave of migrants came to the highlands. Their presence is identified by multicolor ceramics, housing, and farms. These groups were still in residence upon the arrival of the Spanish invaders. They left abundant traces of their occupation that have been studied since the 16th century, allowing scientists to reconstruct their way of life. The Muisca may have integrated with more ancient inhabitants, but the Muisca were the ones who molded the cultural profile and the social and political organization. Their language, a dialect of Chibcha, was very similar to those peoples of the Sierra Nevada de Santa Marta (Kogi, Ijka, Wiwa, and Kankuamo) and the Sierra Nevada del Cocuy (U'wa).

==== Wars ====
Zipa Saguamanchica (ruled 1470 to 1490) was in a constant war against aggressive tribes such as the Sutagao, and especially the Panche, who would also make difficulties for his successors, Nemequene and Tisquesusa. Kalina Caribs were also a permanent threat as rivals of the zaque of Hunza, especially for the possession of the salt mines of Zipaquirá, Nemocón and Tausa.

== Political and administrative organization ==
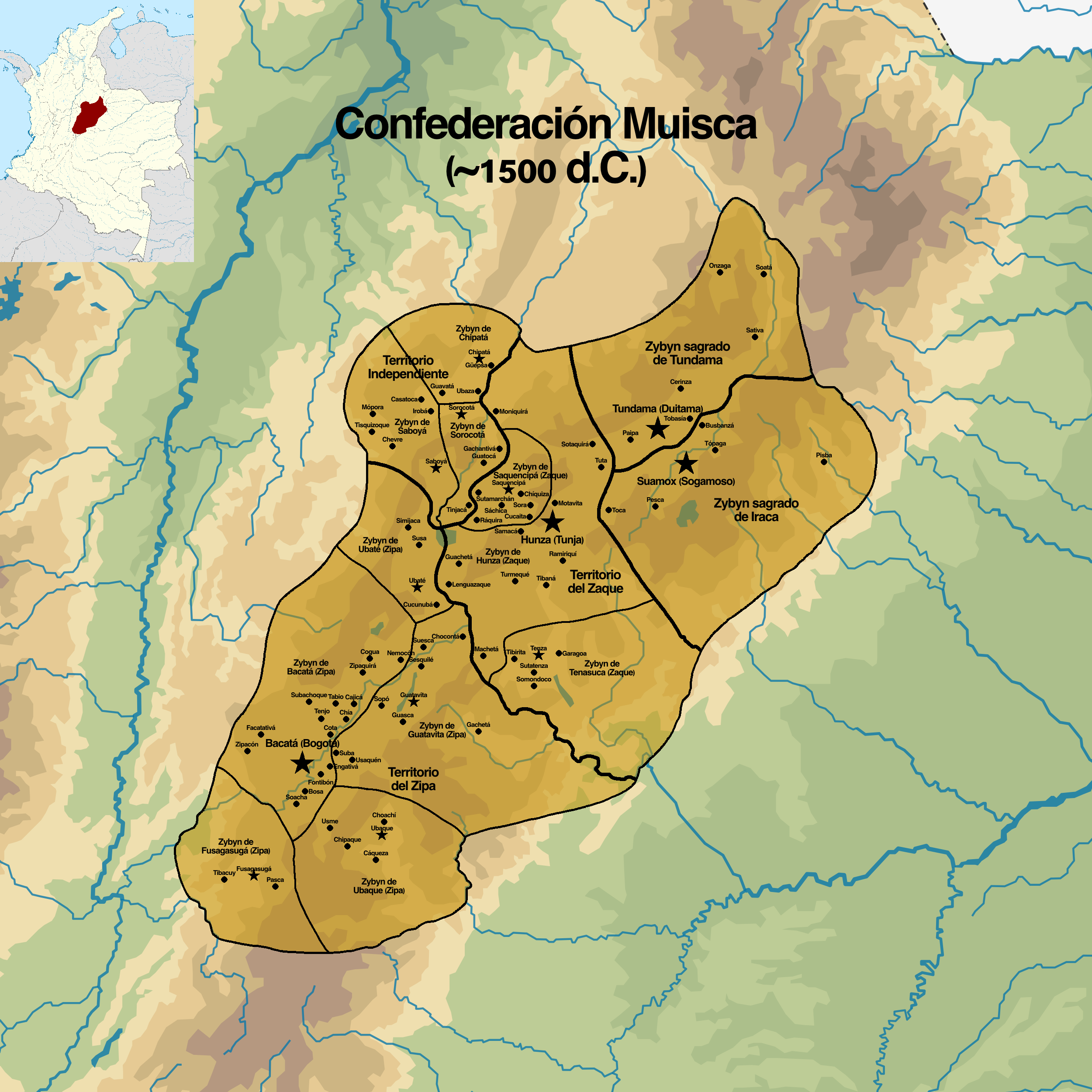
Territory of the Muisca Confederation; Showing the Zipa, Zaque, and Independent territories

The Muisca people were organized in multiple confederations that was a loose union of polities that each retained sovereignty. The confederation was not a kingdom, as there was no absolute monarch, nor was it an empire, because it did not dominate other ethnic groups or peoples. It is hard to compare the Muisca Confederation with other American civilizations, such as the Aztec or the Inca empires as it was more similar to a confederation of states, such as the Achaean League. The Muisca Confederation was one of the biggest and best-organized confederations of tribes on the South American continent.

Every tribe within the confederation was ruled by a chief or a cacique. Most of the tribes were part of the Muisca ethnic group, sharing the same language and culture and forming relations through trade. They united in the face of a common enemy. The army was the responsibility of the zipa or zaque. Güeches, the traditional ancient warriors of the Muisca, made up the military.

The Muisca Confederation existed as the union of two lesser confederations. The southern confederation, headed by the zipa, had its capital at Bacatá (now Bogotá). This southern polity included most of the Muisca population and held greater economic power.

The northern territory was ruled by the zaque, and had its capital in Hunza, known today as Tunja. Although both areas had common political relations and affinities and belonged to the same tribal nation, rivalries still existed between them. Among the territories there were four chiefdoms: Bacatá, Hunza, Duitama, and Sogamoso. The chiefdom was composed by localities. The tribes were divided into Capitanías (ruled by a capitan). There were two kinds: Great Capitania (sybyn) and Minor Capitania (uta). The status of Capitan was inherited by maternal lineage.

Confederation (zipa or zaque)

→ Priests (Iraca)

→ Chiefdoms (Cacique)

→ Capitanía (Capitan)

→ Sybyn

→ Uta

- Territories of the zipa:
1. Bacatá rule: Teusaquillo, Tenjo, Subachoque, Facatativá, Tabio, Cota, Chía, Engativá, Usme, Zipaquirá, Nemocón and Zipacón
2. Fusagasugá District: Fusagasugá, Pasca and Tibacuy
3. Ubaté District: Ubaté, Cucunubá, Simijaca, Susa
4. Guatavita District: Gachetá, Guatavita and Suesca, Chocontá, Teusacá, Sesquilé, Guasca, Sopó, Usaquén, Tuna, Suba
- Territories of the zaque:
  - Hunza rule: Soracá, Ramiriquí, Samacá, Machetá, Tenza, Tibiritá, Lenguazaque and Turmequé
- Territory of Tundama: Cerinza, Oicatá, Onzaga, Sativanorte, Sativasur, Soatá, Paipa, Tobasia
- Territory of Sugamuxi: Busbanzá, Toca, Pesca, Pisba, Tópaga
- Autonomous chiefdoms: Charalá, Chipatá, Tinjacá, Saboyá, Tacasquirá

Muisca legislation was customary law; that is, their rule of law was determined by long-extant customs with the approval of the zip or zaque. This kind of legislation was suitable for a well-organized confederation system. Natural resources could not be privatized: woods, lakes, plateaus, rivers, and other natural resources were common goods.

== Language ==
Muisca numerals as depicted by Acosta, Von Humboldt and Zerda

Muisca or Muysca, also known as Chibcha, belongs to the Chibchan languages. At the height of its expanse, the language was spoken across several regions of Central America and the north of South America. The Tairona culture and the U'wa, related to the Muisca culture, speak similar languages, which encouraged trade. The Muisca used a form of hieroglyphs for numbers.

Many Muisca words were absorbed into Colombian Spanish:

- Geography: Many names of localities and regions were kept. In some cases, the Spanish named cities with a combination of Chibcha and Spanish words, such as Santa Fe de Bogotá (Chibcha: "Bacatá"). Most of the municipalities of the Boyacá and Cundinamarca departments are derived from Chibcha names: Chocontá, Sogamoso, Zipaquirá, and many others.
- Fruits, such as curuba and uchuva.
- Relations: the youngest child is called cuba.

== Economy ==
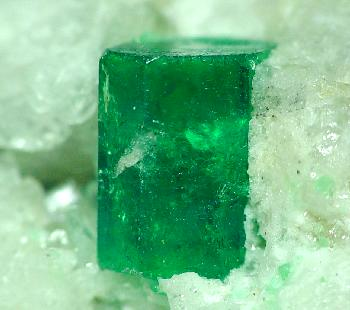
Emerald from Muzo

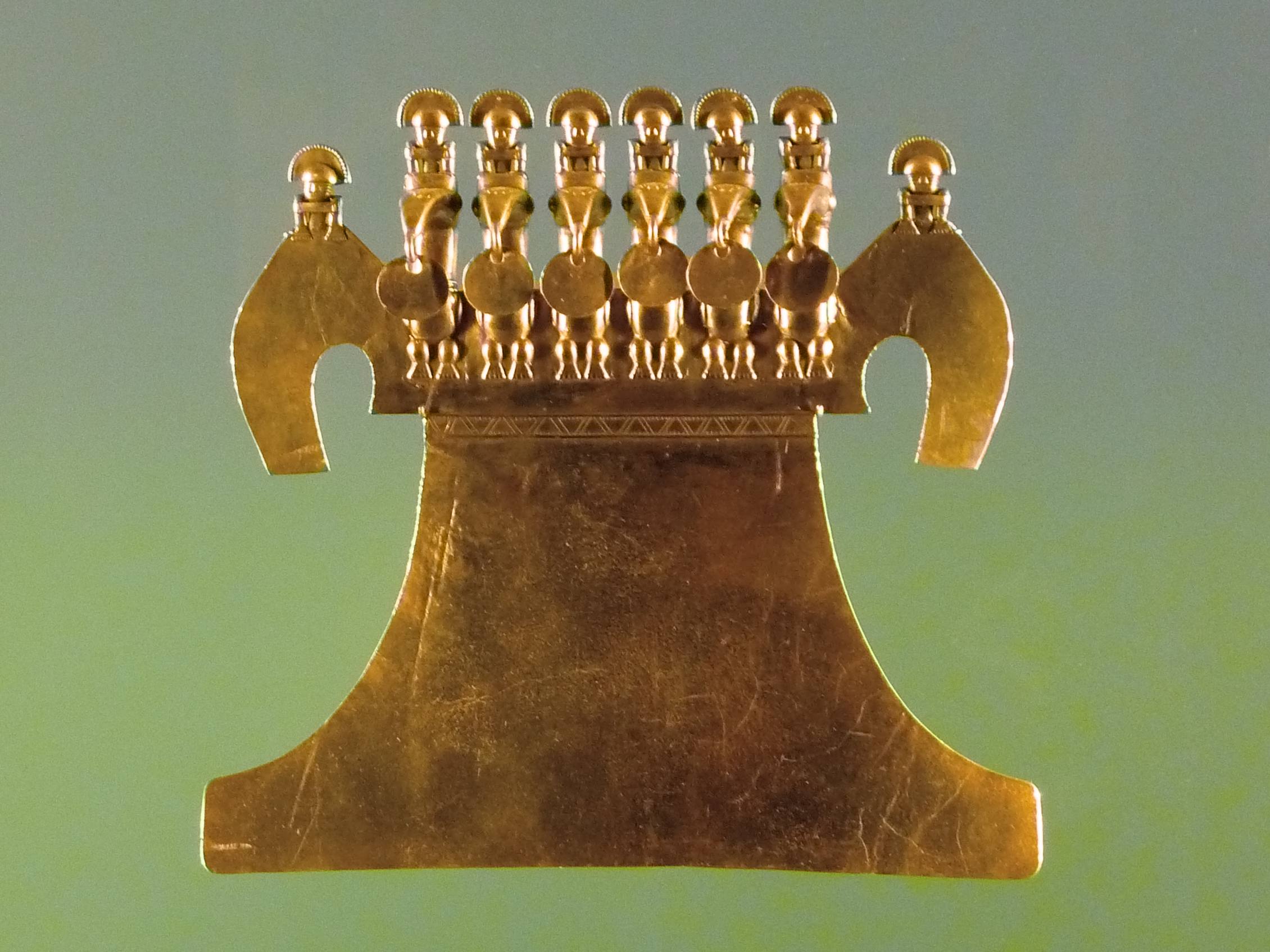
Golden breastplate

The Muisca had an economy and society that was considered to have been one of the most powerful of the American Post-Classic stage, mainly because of the precious resources of the area: gold and emeralds. When the Spaniards arrived in Muisca territory, they found a prosperous state, with the Muisca Confederation controlling the mining of the following products:

- emeralds: Colombia is the primary producer of emeralds in the world
- copper
- coal: the coal mines still operate today at Zipaquirá and other sites. Colombia has some of the world's most significant coal reserves.
- salt: there were mines in production at Nemocón, Zipaquirá, and Tausa
- gold: gold was imported from other regions but was so abundant that it became a preferred material for Muisca handicrafts. The many handicraft works in gold and the zipa tradition of offering gold to the goddess Guatavita contributed to the legend of El Dorado.

The Muisca traded their goods at local and regional markets with a system of barter. Items traded ranged from basic necessities to luxury goods. The abundance of salt, emeralds, and coal brought these commodities to de facto currency status.

Having developed an agrarian society, the people used terrace farming and irrigation in the highlands. Main products were fruits, coca, quinoa, yuca and potatoes.

Another major economic activity was weaving. The people made a wide variety of complex textiles. Scholar Paul Bahn said, "The Andean cultures mastered almost every method of textile weaving or decoration now known, and their products were often finer than those of today."

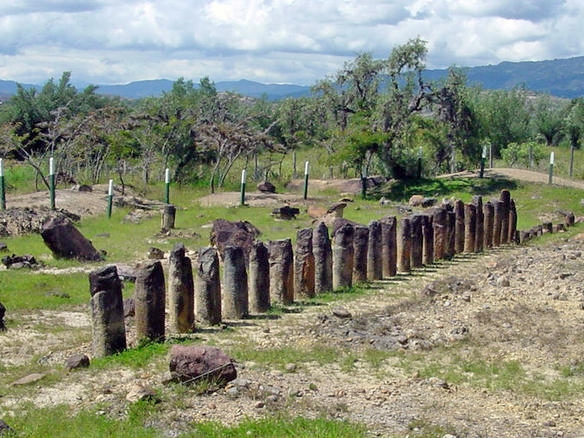
Ruins of the astronomical Muisca temple at El Infiernito ("the little hell") near Villa de Leyva

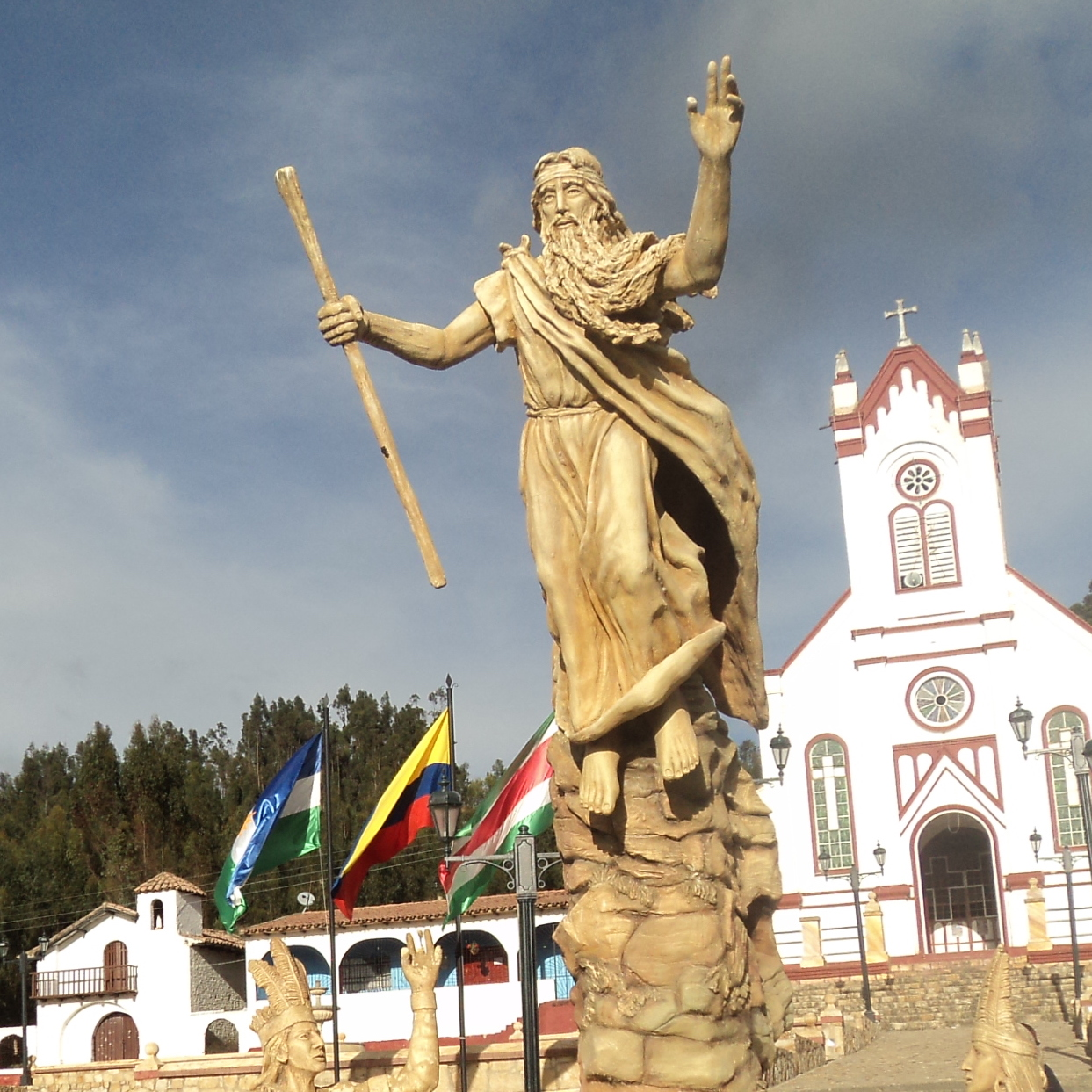
Monument to Bochica in the town of Cuítiva, Boyacá

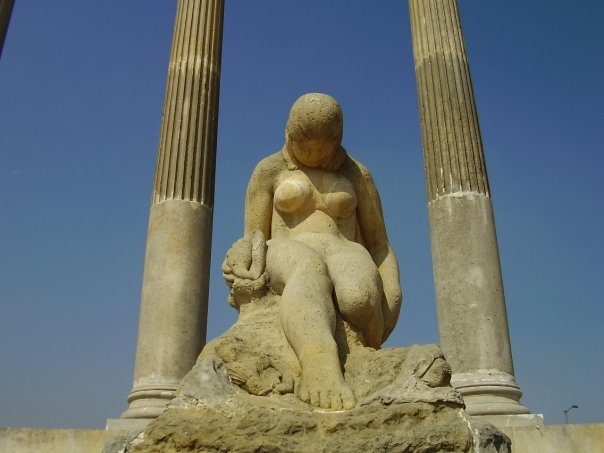
Statue of water Goddess Sie identified with Bachué Carved in stone by Bogotan sculptor María Teresa Zerda

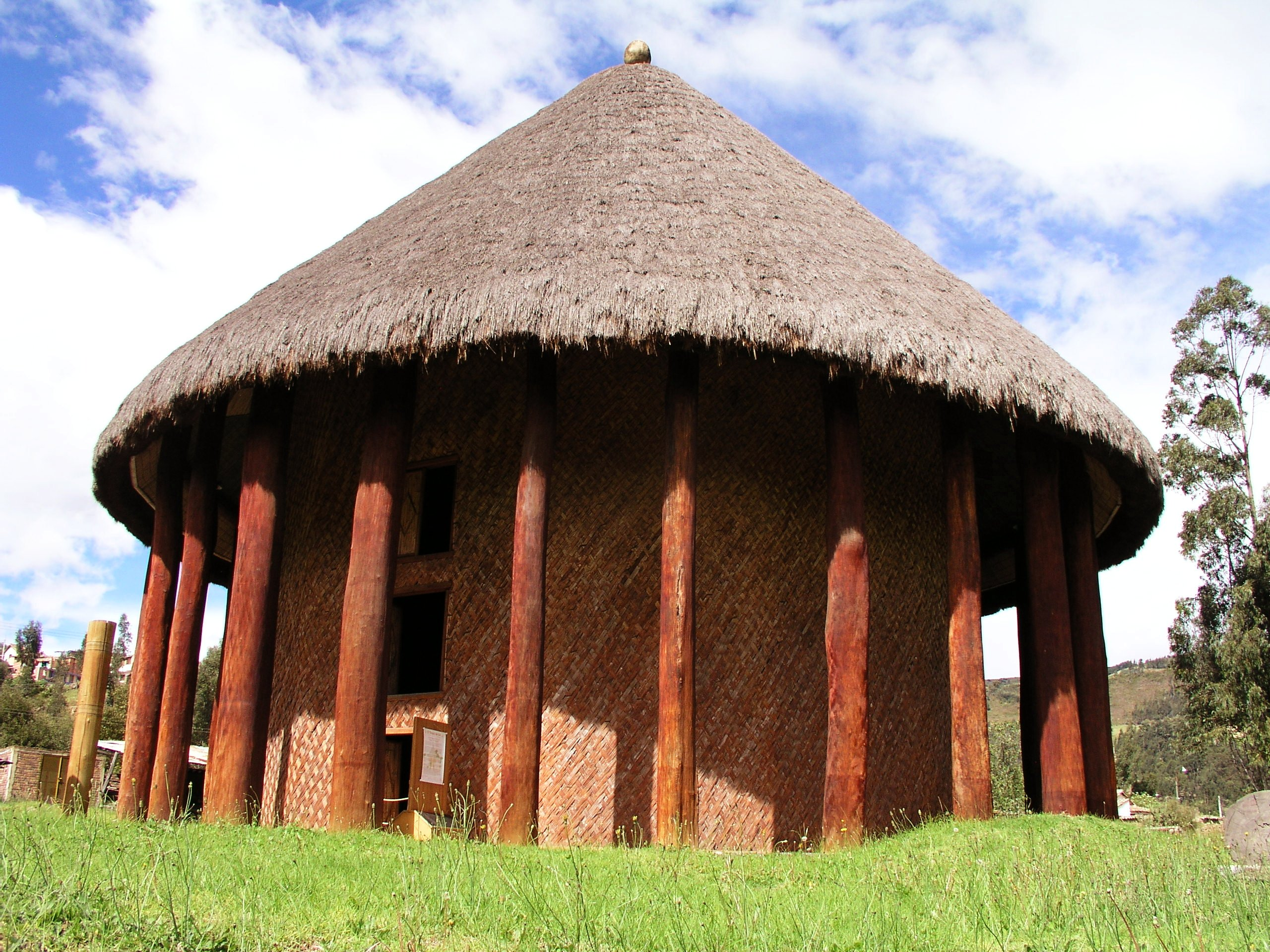
Reconstruction of the Sun temple Archaeology Museum, Sogamoso

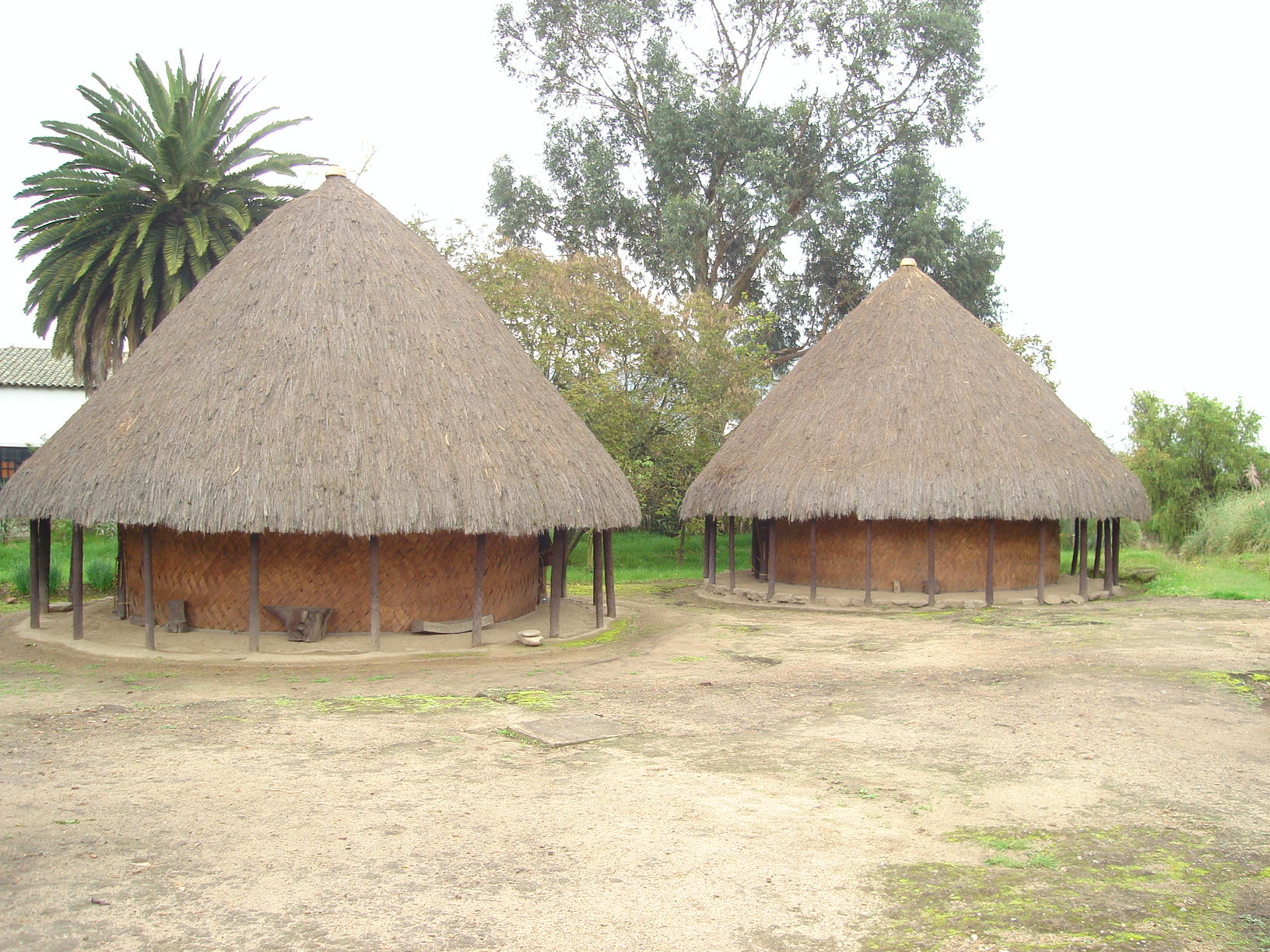
Model of Muisca houses Archaeology Museum of Sogamoso

== Culture ==
The Muisca were an agrarian and ceramic society of the Andes of the north of South America. Their political and administrative organization enabled them to form a compact cultural unity with great discipline.

The contributions of the Muisca culture to the Colombian national identity have been many.

=== Heraldry ===
Pre-Columbian Muisca patterns appear in various seals of modern municipalities located on the Altiplano Cundiboyacense, for instance Sopó and Guatavita, Cundinamarca. The remaining Muisca people in central Colombia also have their own seal.

=== Sports ===
The Muisca culture had certain sports which were part of their rituals. The turmequé game, also known as tejo, has survived and became a popular sport of Colombia. Also important were matches of wrestling. The winner received a finely woven cotton blanket from the chief and was qualified as a guecha warrior.

=== Religion ===
Recent scholarship on the Muisca contends that Lucas Fernández de Piedrahita's 1688 Historia general of New Granada, has unduly shaped understandings of Muisca religion, saying that it was "full of confident assertions concerning a Muisca 'religion' with a pantheon of deities, creation stories, and visions of the afterlife, led from great temples by high priests – some of whom were pictured, at great expense, in three richly illustrated pages that accompanied his book."

Muisca priests were educated from childhood and led the main religious ceremonies. Only the priests could enter the temples. Besides the religious activities, the priests had much influence in the lives of the people, giving counsel in matters of farming or war. The religion originally included human sacrifice, but the practice may have been extinct by the time of the Spanish conquest, as there are no first-hand Spanish accounts.

Oral tradition suggests that every family gave up a child for sacrifice, that the children were regarded as sacred and cared for until the age of 15, when their lives were then offered to the Sun-god, Sué.

==== Deities ====
- Sué, Suá, Zuhé or Xué (The Sun god): he is the father of the Muisca. His temple was in Suamox, the sacred city of the Sun. He was the most venerated god, especially by the Confederation of the zaque, who was considered his descendant.
- Chía (The Moon-goddess): her temple was in what is today the municipality of Chía. She was widely worshipped by the Confederation of the zipa, who was considered her son.
- Bochica: though not properly a god, he enjoyed the same status as one. He was a chief or hero eternized in the oral tradition. The land was flooded by a goddess, a beautiful and sometimes mean woman, or by Chibchacum, protector of the farmers. Bochica listened to the complaints of the Muisca about floods. With his stick, he broke two rocks at the edge of the Tequendama Falls and all the water came out, forming a waterfall. Bochica punished Huitaca and Chibchacum: He made Huitaca an owl and made her hold up the sky. Chibchacum was tasked with holding up the Earth.
- Bachué: the mother of the Muisca people. It was said that a beautiful woman with a baby came out of Lake Iguaque. Bachué sat down at the bank of the lake and waited for the child to grow up. When he was old enough, they married and had many children, who were the Muisca. Bachué taught them to hunt, to farm, to respect the laws, and to worship the gods. Bachué was so good and loved that the Muisca referred to her as Furachoque (Good woman in Chibcha). When they became old, Bachué and her husband decided to go back to the deep of the lagoon. That day the Muisca were so sad, but at the same time very happy because they knew their mother was very happy. Other versions of the legend say that after stepping into the lagoon of Iguaque, Bachué ascended to the sky and became Chía; in other versions Chia and Bachué are two different figures.

==== Astronomy ====
The cult of the Muisca centered on two main deities; Sué for the Sun and Chía for the Moon. They developed a vigesimal (based on 20) calendar and knew exactly the timing of the summer solstice (June 21), which they considered the Day of Sué, the Sun god. The Sué temple was in Sogamoso, the sacred city of the Sun and the seat of the Iraca (priest). The Muisca name of the city, Suamox or Sugamuxi, means "City of the Sun". On the solstice, the zaque went to Suamox for a major festival where ritual offerings were made. It was the only day of the year when the zaque showed his face, as he was considered a descendant of the Sun god.

=== Mythology ===
The Muisca mythology is well documented. Many of the writers who contributed to the Chronicles of the West Indies were based in Bogotá. They recorded many of the myths as they were interested in the traditions and culture of the conquered people. The Muisca territory became the seat of the colonial administration for the New Kingdom of Granada (Spanish: Nuevo Reino de Granada).

=== El Dorado ===
The origin of the legend of El Dorado (Spanish for "The Golden") in the early 16th century may originate with the Muisca Confederation. In 1539, Sebastián de Belalcázar's treasurer, Gonzalo de la Peña, wrote that the expedition left Popayán towards Bogotá "in search of a land called El Dorado". This marks the earliest recorded use of the phrase, occurring just before his meeting with Jiménez de Quesada and the Muisca. In 1550, over ten years after the conquest, Jiménez de Quesada described the continued quest for El Dorado: "All the reports ... which set everyone's feet marching from the North Sea so excitedly ... later appeared to be the same thing, namely this kingdom of New Granada."

Other Spanish references speak of El Dorado not as a golden land, but rather to chief whose body was anointed in gold powder as part of a ritual. The zipa offered gold and other treasures to the Guatavita goddess. To do so, the zipa covered himself with gold dust and washed it off in the lake while tossing gold trinkets into the waters. This tradition was well known outside the Confederation, as far as the Caribbean Sea. Two small golden rafts were discovered in 1856 and 1969 that seem to confirm this ritual. Each was in the Muisca style of gold work, with a primary central chief surrounded by attendants. The first of these artifacts was destroyed in a fire, while the surviving raft can be seen in Bogotá's Museo del Oro (Museum of Gold).

The Spaniards were attracted by stories of a "city of gold" that did not exist. Indigenous people sometimes got rid of the avaricious Spaniards in that way, pointing them in the direction of other peoples. Lake Guatavita was explored by conquistadors who were looking for gold offerings from the zipa to the goddess. The legend grew until the term became a metaphor for any place where great wealth may be found or made.

=== Architecture ===
The Muisca did not construct large stone structures. They did not use the abundant rock to leave monumental ruins as has happened with other American cultures. Their houses were built with clay, canes, and wood. The houses had a conical form, most of them to the point that Gonzalo Jiménez de Quesada, founder of Bogotá, gave the area the name Valle de los Alcázares ("Valley of the Palaces"). The houses had small doors and windows, and the dwellings of the higher rank citizens were different. The Muisca used little furniture as they would typically sit on the floor.

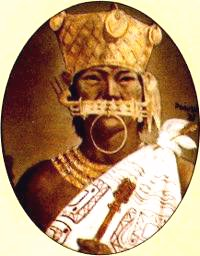
Tisquesusa, zipa when the Spanish arrived The zipa was richly ornamented in gold and expensive cloth

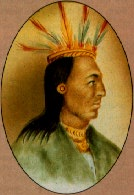
Aquiminzaque, the last zaque, executed by the Spanish

== The Spanish conquest ==
The conquest of the Muisca began with Gonzalo Jiménez de Quesada's 1536 expedition up the Magdalena River into the Colombian highlands. There his men encountered the thriving expanse of rich villages spread across a lush plateau. The conquistadors proceeded to loot the Muisca's temples and capture their leaders, holding them for ransom to extract their whereabouts of their gold.

Rivalries between the zaque and the zipa were taken advantage of by the Spaniards as they conquered the heart of what would be Colombia. The presence of the Spaniards gave hope to both sovereigns that, were they to make one Confederation, they could prevail in a war against the Spaniards. However, the Spaniards prevailed. The reaction of the chief leaders and the people did little to change the destiny of the Confederations. The Spanish executed the last Muisca sovereigns, Sagipa and Aquiminzaque, in 1539 and 1540, respectively.

In 1539, two other expeditions converged on the territory of the Muisca, led by Sebastián de Belalcázar and Nicolás de Federman, who were also searching for lands rich in gold. Despite Jiménez's early arrival, each tried to lay claim to the region. The three leaders traveled back to Spain together to have the dispute adjudicated in court.

In 1542, Gonzalo Suárez Rendón finally put down the last resistance. The territories of the Confederations were distributed as encomiendas among the soldiers of Belalcazar, Federmann, and Jiménez De Quesada. Later the Spanish Crown would elect Jiménez as the mayor of Bogotá, with the title adelantado de los cabildos de Santa Fe y Tunja. Bogotá would later become the capital of the Spaniard's New Kingdom of Granada.

=== Last Muisca sovereigns ===
- Zipas of Bacatá:
  - Meicuchuca (1450–1470)
  - Saguamanchica (1470–1490)
  - Nemequene (1490–1514)
  - Tisquesusa (1514–1537)
  - Sagipa (1537–1539)
- Zaques of Hunza:
  - Hunzahúa (?-1470)
  - Michuá (1470–1490)
  - Quemuenchatocha (1490–1537)
  - Aquiminzaque (1537–1540)

=== Under the colonial regime ===
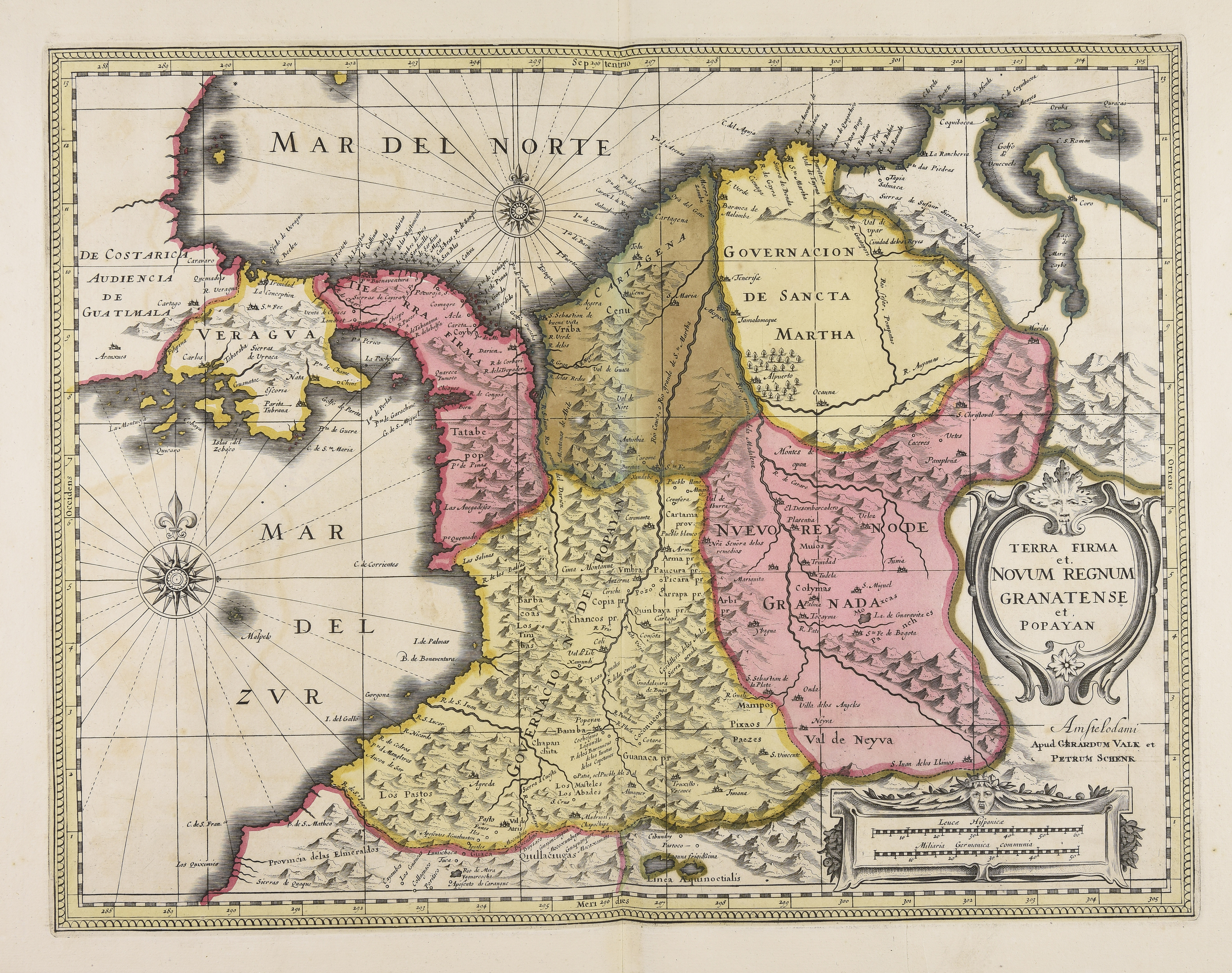
Map of Nuevo Reino de Granada (1625)

When the Muisca structure disappeared under the Spanish Conquest, the territory of the Confederations of the zaque and zipa were included in a new political division within the Spanish colonies in America. The territory of the Muisca, located in a fertile plain of the Colombian Andes that contributed to make one of the most advanced South American civilizations, became part of the colonial region named Nuevo Reino de Granada. Much information about the Muisca culture was gathered by the Spanish administration and by authors such as Pedro de Aguado and Lucas Fernández de Piedrahita. The viceregal era contributed to the importance of Bogotá, and people from the area would play an important role in the fights for independence and republican consolidation.

=== Independent Colombia ===
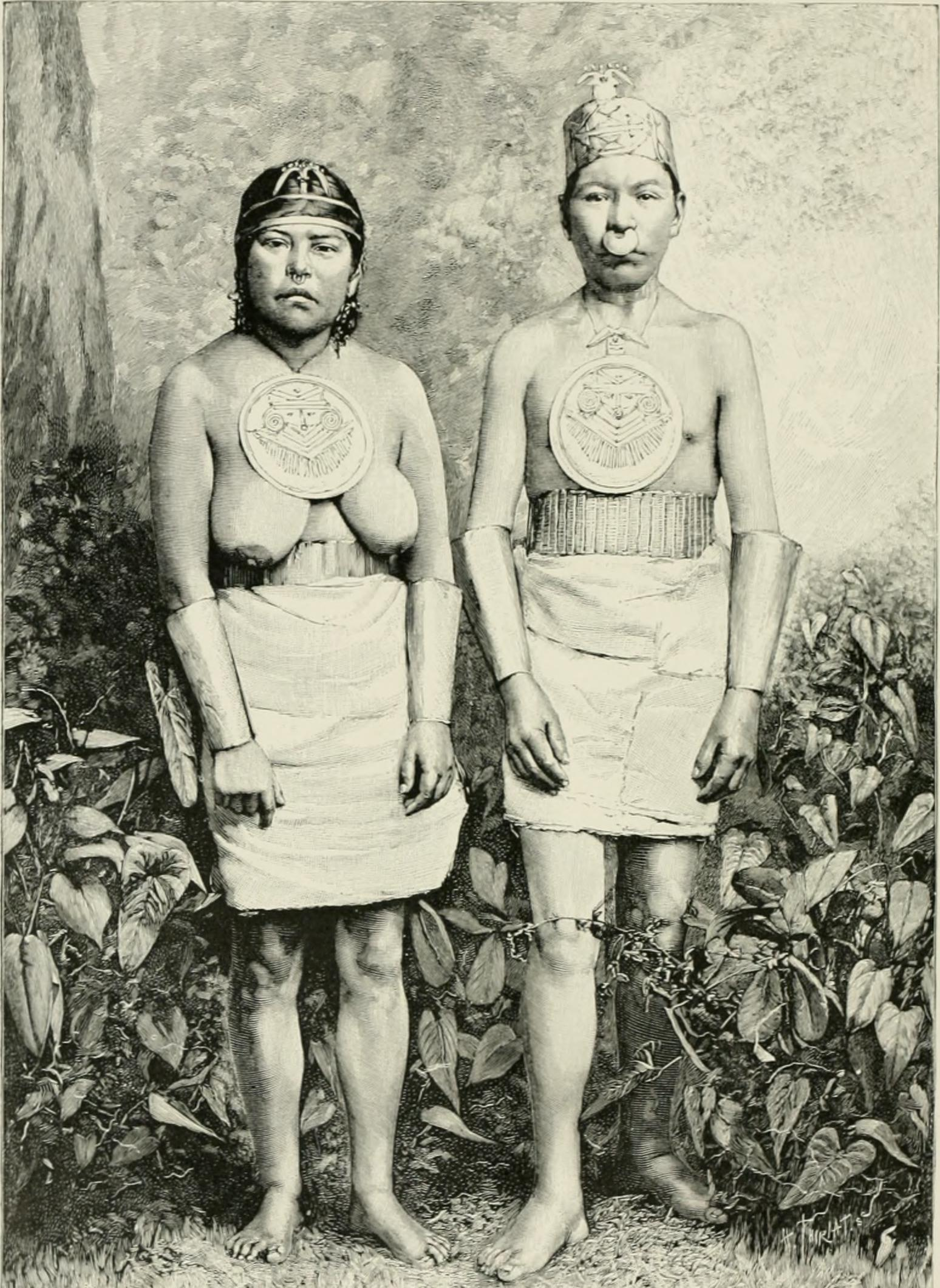
Muisca people (1882)

==== 20th century ====
After independence in 1810, the new state dissolved many of the Indigenous reservations. The one in Tocancipá was dissolved in 1940. The one in Sesquilé was reduced to 10% of its original size. Tenjo was reduced to 54% of its original size after 1934, and the Indigenous lands in Suba, a northern region in modern-day Bogotá, which had been recognized and protected by the crown, were taken away by the republican governments following a strategy of suppression of the native culture and ethnic presence in the country's largest urban centres. The Reservation of Cota was re-established on land bought by the community in 1916, and then recognized by the 1991 constitution; the recognition was withdrawn in 1998 by the state and restored in 2006.

In 1948 the state forbade the production of chicha, a corn-based alcoholic drink. This was a blow to the culture and economy of the Muisca. The ban remained until 1991. Since then, the "Festival of the chicha, maize, life, and joy" is celebrated every year in Barrio La Perseverancia, a neighborhood in Bogotá where most of the chicha is produced.

==== 21st century ====
Rediscovery of the Muisca indigenous heritage El redescubrimiento de la tradición indígena

Since 1989, there has been a process of reconstruction of the Indigenous councils by the surviving members of the Muisca culture. Muisca Councils currently working are Suba, Bosa, Cota, Chía, and Sesquilé. The councils had an Assembly in Bosa on 20–22 September 2002, called the First General Congress of the Muisca People. In that congress, they founded the Cabildo Mayor del Pueblo Muisca, affiliated to the National Indigenous Organization of Colombia (ONIC). They proposed linguistic and cultural recuperation, defense of the territories nowadays occupied by others, and proposed urban and tourist plans. They support the communities of Ubaté, Tocancipá, Soacha, Ráquira, and Tenjo in their efforts to recover their organizational and human rights.

The Muisca people of Suba opposed the drying up of the Tibabuyes wetland and wanted to recover the Juan Amarillo wetland. They defended the natural reserves like La Conejera, part of the Suba Hills that is considered by the Shelter's Council to be communal land. Suati Magazine (The Song of the Sun) is a publication of poetry, literature, and essays about Muisca culture.

The community of Bosa made important achievements in its project of natural medicine in association with the Paul VI Hospital and the District Secretary of Health of Bogotá. The community of Cota has reintroduced the growing of quinua, and regularly barter their products at market.

Toward the end of 2006 there was a report on the Muisca population:

- Three Muisca councils: Cota, Chía, and Sesquilé, with a population of 2,318 persons
- in the Capital District 5,186 people are registered as belonging to the Muisca ethnic group
- in the localities of Suba and Bosa, 1,573 people are registered
- the report does not include the number of people of the Muisca ethnic group in the entire territory of the ancient Muisca Confederation or outside that territory. It does not include Muisca Creole persons, it is to say, those of mixed Muisca ancestry.

== Sources on the Muisca and scholarly research ==
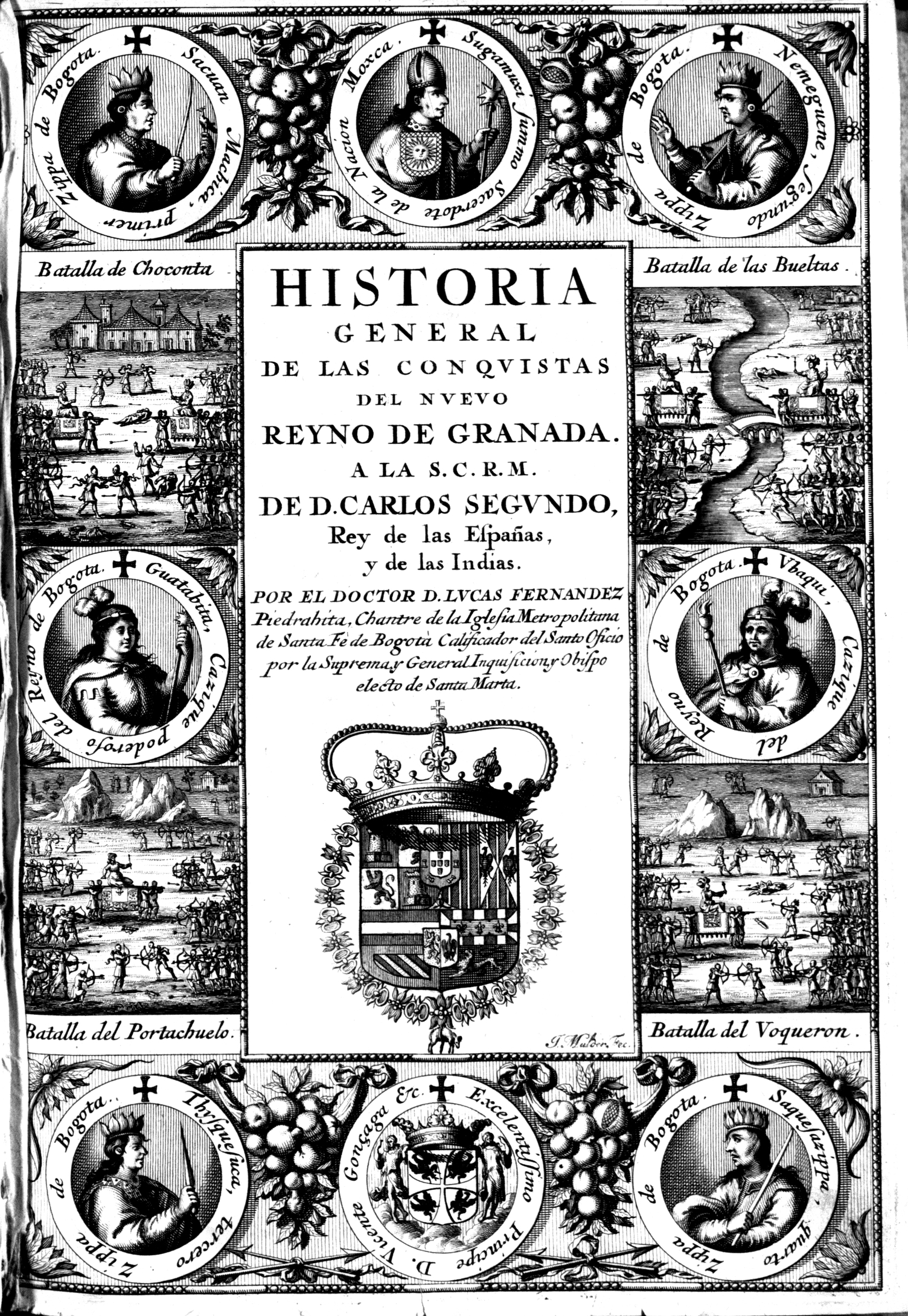
Lucas Fernández de Piedrahita, Historia general de las conquistas del Nuevo Reyno de Granada, 1688

Writings on the Muisca have a long tradition, dating from the conquest era with Spanish chronicles, colonial-era Spanish religious and civil administrative records, the findings of modern archeologists and anthropologists, and revised interpretations by scholars in recent years. Unlike the Indigenous peoples of Mesoamerica, the Muisca did not have a system of writing before the Spanish invasion in the 16th century and during the colonial era, so that the understanding of Muisca history and culture has largely been based non-native sources. A Spanish document named "Epítome de la Conquista Del Nueva Rieno de Granada" (Summary of the Conquest of the New Kingdom of Granada) provides what is considered the most complete description of Muisca culture. The author is unknown but is believed to be Gonzalo Jiménez de Quesada.

Spanish cleric Lucas Fernández de Piedrahita authored a major work the New Kingdom of Granada, the Historia general de las conquistas de; Nuevo Reyno de Granada, a la S.C.R.M. de D. Carlos Segundo, 1688, which has shaped colonial era and, until recently, modern understandings of the Muisca. This work creates an image of the Precolombian Muisca, with powerful political structures and a unified religion and priestly hierarchy. Recent scholarship has re-examined early published writings and sought new sources in a variety of archives to posit a different understanding of the Muisca. The Muisca have been integral to the formation of national identity in Colombia, with Colombian scholar Carl Henrik Langebaek describing them as "the official 'tribe' of the Colombian nation" and "a local version of the Aztecs and Incas". The interpretation of the sixteenth-century Spanish invasion has received new attention which departs from a Eurocentric, triumphalist narrative.

Since independence in the early nineteenth century, investigations into Muisca culture as part of national identity formation began. In 1849 president Tomás Cipriano de Mosquera invited Italian cartographer Agustín Codazzi, who led the Geography Commission with Manuel Ancízar and did descriptive studies of the national territory and an inventory of the archaeological sites. The result of the expedition was published in Bogotá in 1889 as Peregrinación Alfa. Argüello García pointed out that the goal of that expedition in the context of the new nation was to underline the pre-Hispanic societies and in that sense, they centered on the Muisca culture as the main model. A similar tendency can be found in the works of Ezequiel Uricoechea. An objection to that point of view came from Vicente Restrepo: his work Los chibchas antes de la conquista española showed them as barbarians.

Miguel Triana, in his work La Civilización Chibcha suggested that the rock art symbols were writing. Wenceslao Cabrera Ortíz was the one who concluded that the Muisca were migrants to the highlands; in 1969 he published on this and reported about excavations at the El Abra archaeological site. Those publications opened a new era in the studies of the pre-Hispanic cultures in Colombia.

Recent archaeological work has also concentrated on the creation and composition of Muisca goldwork, with this data being made available for wider research.

== Named after the Muisca and their culture ==
Several (fossil) flora and fauna found in Colombia in the area of the Muisca have been named after the people. Two volcanoes on Jupiter's moon Io have been named after the Muisca religion and mythology.

=== Timeline of inhabitation of the Muisca area ===
Timeline of inhabitation of the Altiplano Cundiboyacense, Colombia
| Altiplano Muisca Confederation |

== See also ==
- Spanish conquest of the Muisca
- New Kingdom of Granada
- Indigenous peoples in Colombia
  - Panche, Achagua, Guane, Guayupe, Lache, Muzo, Tegua
- Mesoamerica
  - Aztecs, Maya
- Tunjo

== Bibliography ==
- Fernández-Alonso, José Luis; Groenendijk, Jeroen P. (2023). "A new species of Zephyranthes herb. S.L. (Amaryllidaceae, Hippeastreae) with notes on the genus in Colombia" (PDF). Rev. Acad. Colomb. Cie. 28 (107): 177–186. doi:10.18257/raccefyn.28(107).2004.1987. ISSN 0370-3908.
- Olivares, Tania S.; Burckhardt, Daniel (1997). "Jumping plant-lice of the New World genus Calinda (Hemiptera:Psylloidea:Triozidae)". Revue suisse de Zoologie. 104. Geneva, Switzerland: Société Suisse de Zoologie: 231–344. doi:10.5962/bhl.part.79999. ISSN 0035-418X.
- Izquierdo Peña, Manuel Arturo (2009). "The Muisca Calendar: An approximation to the timekeeping system of the ancient native people of the northeastern Andes of Colombia". pp. 1–170. arXiv:0812.0574 [physics.hist-ph]. Université de Montréal.
- Pérez, Sandra; Wolff, Marta; De Carvalho, Claudio J.B. (19 November 2012). "A new species of Brachygasterina Macquart from Colombia, and description of the males of B. stuebeli Röder and B. muisca Soares & Carvalho (Diptera: Muscidae) – Abstract" (PDF). Zootaxa. 3554: 45–57. doi:10.11646/zootaxa.3554.1.3. ISSN 1175-5334.
