= Fusagasugá =

- Municipality and city
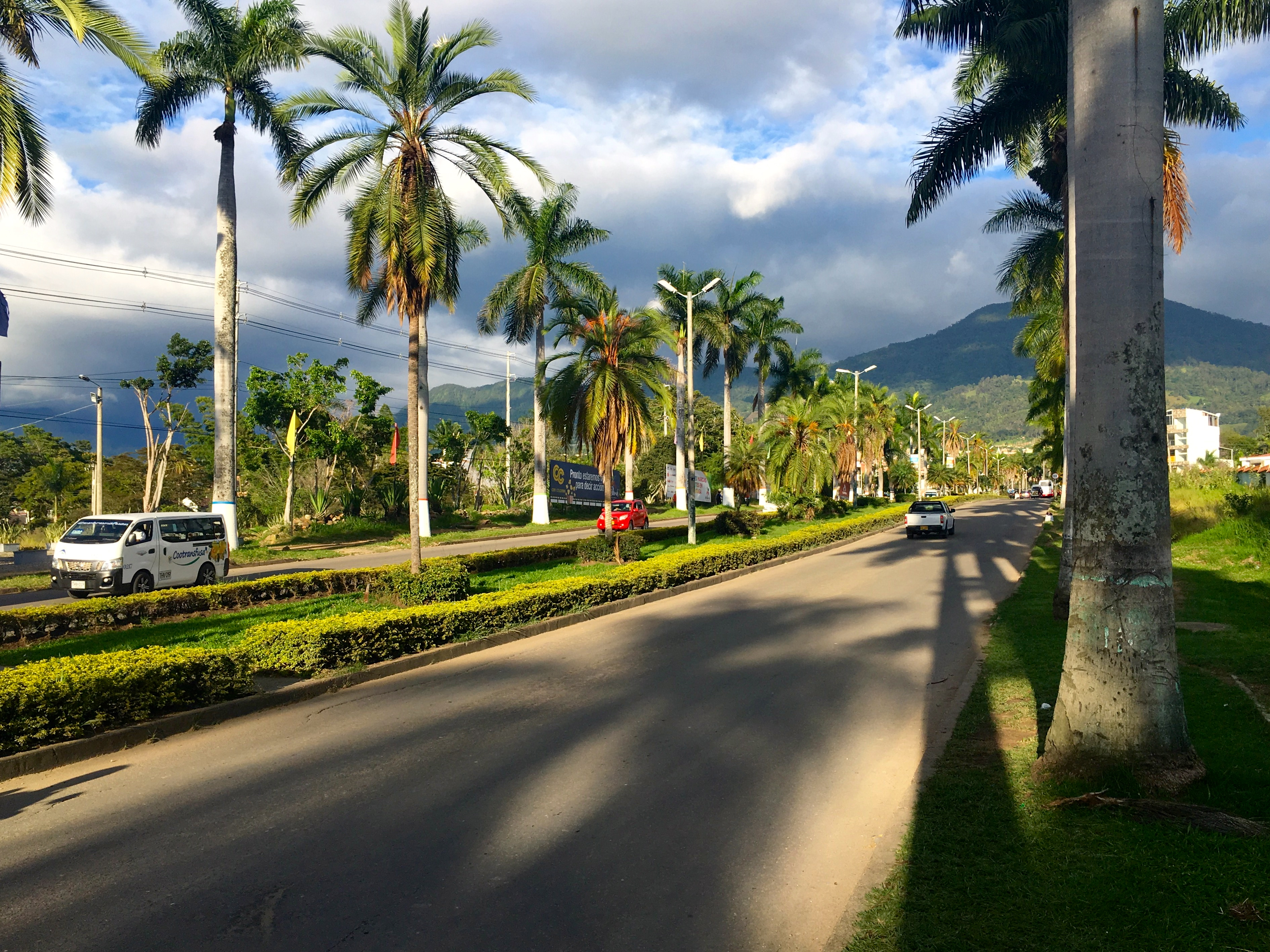
- Palmas Avenue, Center

- Flag Coat of arms
- Nickname: The Garden City of Colombia
- Motto: Tierra Grata Pleasing Earth
- Location of the town and municipality of Fusagasugá in Cundinamarca Department.

- Location within Colombia
- Coordinates: 4°20′42.55″N 74°21′42.56″W
- Country: Colombia
- Region: Andean Region
- Department: Cundinamarca
- Province: Sumapaz Province
- Established as Town for Natives: February 5–13, 1592
- Established as Town for Whites: May 7, 1776

Government
  - Type: Municipality
  - Mayor: William Fayad

Area
  - Municipality and city: 193.9 km^{2} (74.9 sq mi)
  - Urban: 14.42 km^{2} (5.57 sq mi)
  - Rural: 179.48 km^{2} (69.30 sq mi)
- Elevation: 1,765 m (5,791 ft)
- Highest elevation: 3,050 m (10,010 ft)
- Lowest elevation: 550 m (1,800 ft)

Population (2018 census)
  - Municipality and city: 138,498
  - Density: 714.3/km^{2} (1,850/sq mi)
  - Urban: 114,722
  - Urban density: 7,956/km^{2} (20,610/sq mi)
  - Rural: 23,776
  - Rural density: 132.47/km^{2} (343.10/sq mi)
- Demonym: fusagasugueño
- Area code: 57 + 1
- Website: www.fusagasuga.gov.co// (in Spanish)

Fusagasugá (Spanish pronunciation: [fusaɣasuˈɣa]; from Cariban fusagasuga 'woman who becomes invisible') or Fusa is a city and municipality in the department of Cundinamarca, in central Colombia. It is located in the warm valley between the rivers Cuja and Panches, a central region of the Andes Mountains in South America. The municipality has a population of 138,498 and the urban centre a population of 114,722 (2018 census). The municipality itself covers an area of 194 km^{2} (75 sq mi).

It was founded in 1592 by Spanish priests. The town located some 56 kilometers from the capital, Bogotá; borders Pasca, Arbeláez, Tibacuy, Silvania and other municipalities of Sumapaz. Its elevation is 5,669 feet (1,728 m) above sea level, and the average temperature 20 °C (68 °F).

== Toponymy ==
The interpretation of the name in Spanish varies from "Mujer que se hace invisible" (Woman who becomes invisible) to "Mujer que se esconde tras la montaña" (Woman who hides herself behind the mountain). However, many people shorten its name to "Fusa".

The city has been named "Tierra Grata" due to the farms (Quintas) located on its territory. And commonly is called The Garden City of Colombia ("La Ciudad Jardín de Colombia") for the production of Orchids.

== History ==
The Sutagao people inhabited the region until the new town was founded by Oídor Bernardino Albornoz between 5–13 February 1592. Not much is known about the previous indigenous residents. During the visit of Oídor Ibarra, there were 759 indigenous people residing in Fusagasugá. When Oídor Aróstequi arrived in February 1760, the indigenous population had dwindled to 85, and there were 644 new settlers divided among 109 families. On February 19, 1760, a small hospital was established near the church and Father Vicente de Fresneda was given charge of it.

During a visit, two officials, Moreno and Escandón, considering the decline in the indigenous population and the corresponding growth in the local settler population, issued a decree on January 8, 1776 that the native villages in the Fusagasugá area, Pandi and Tibacuy, no longer existed, and consolidated them into the present-day city of Pasca. In the wake of this decision, all streets and plazas in the cities were renamed.

In 1771, on the direction of the mayor of Fusagasugá, the viceroy Messia de la Zerda ordered the construction of a new avenue, Santafé, which would go from Fusagasugá, passing through the nearby town of Sibaté. On August 8, 1774, Father Francisco Escobar announced that Fusagasugá was on the road that passed over the mountains and led to the neighboring towns of Apicalá and Melgar; such that travelers could not reach Bermajal, located on the same mountain as Fusagasugá, without passing through Fusagasugá. This established the suburb's local importance.

In a directive issued August 7, 1846, the president of the Colombian republic nationally recognized the road from Fusagasugá to the southern provinces, which prompted the construction of a road over the Sumapaz River in Boquerón. In 1852, Fusagasugá became part of the province of Tequendama.

On February 9, 1877, a battle took place in the hacienda El Novillero between government forces led by General Mogollón and the rebels led by Colonel Juan Ardila and Lucas Moreno. The first hospital was constructed in 1893 by the Congregation of the Sacred Heart of Jesus with money donated by Don Manuel María Aya Caicedo and Lady Sagrado Cleofé Diaz, who also founded an adjoining nursing home. Following a directive issued on December 20, 1895, Fusagasugá was made capital of Sumapaz Province, which was created by National Directive 489 on November 7, 1895 and made into Law 162 in 1896.

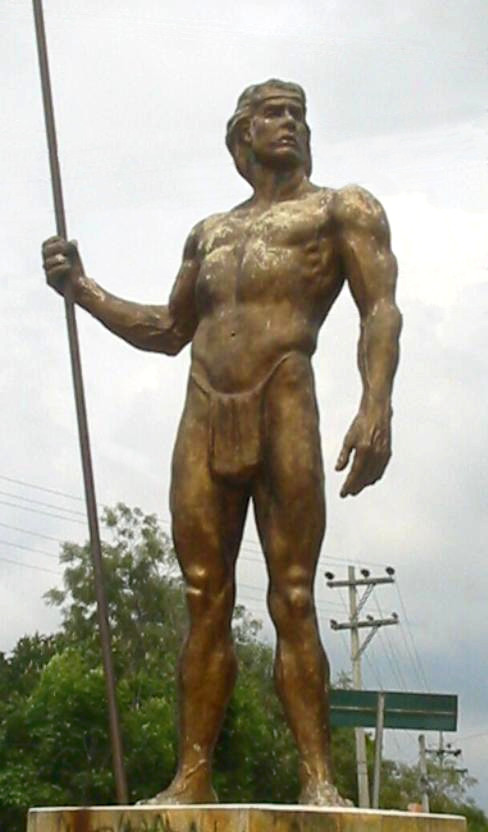
Sculpture of a Sutagao man standing at the entrance of Fusagasugá

On February 22, 1893, Dr José Manuel Goenaga, minister of works of President Miguel Antonio Caro, contracted the construction of a highway between Sibaté, Fusagasugá, and Boquerón. The project's engineer was Enrique Pabón Liévano, a native of Fusagasugá. The project was commenced in 1905 under the administration of President Rafael Reyes but suspended on February 10, 1906 because of an attack by the Barro Colorado. It resumed in March 1913. The highway reached Fusagasugá in 1930 and Arbeláez in 1934.

In 1907, an iron and wood bridge was finished over the Sumapaz River in Boquerón which was given the name "Puente Eliseo Medina" to honor the administration of the time. In 1930, the bridge was used by automobiles for the first time, and was replaced by the current bridge in 1953.

By article 12 of ordinance 21 in 1944, the construction of a highway between Fusagasugá and Boquerón by the river Llano commenced.

The first cemetery, which was on the site of "Pekin" opened in 1822. It was replaced by a second one in 1852 which was located in front of the hospital. A third cemetery was opened by the Cura Sabogal on October 31, 1910.

In 1929, in the Quinta Coburgo, the candidacy of Enrique Olaya Herrera was announced. In 1970, the Institute Técnico Universitario (Technical Institute University) was opened. It had been created by ordinance 45 issued on December 19, 1969 and established there by directive 537 on May 8, 1970 by Governor Joaquín Piñeros Corpas.

The city's main church has been rebuilt numerous times, and for a variety of reasons. The first church was built in June 1658 by Father Andrés Méndez de Valdivieso. The second church was built by Father Poveda in 1707, and lasted until 1865. The third church was built soon after by Father Antonio Martínez. It was made of bricks, but collapsed on September 19, 1908. The fourth church was begun in its place on June 6, 1909, and was consecrated August 15, 1926, soon after its completion. It was consecrated by the local Archbishop, Ismael Perdomo. However, there were other churches throughout the city's existence, including the Nuestra Señora de Belén (English: Our Lady of Bethlehem), consecrated on August 16, 1786.

During World War II, a hotel in the city was used as an internment camp for citizens of Axis power countries.

== Geography ==
=== Climate ===
The urban territory is between 550 m and 3,050 m above sea level, with an average height 1,728 m (5,669 ft). Its average temperature is 19 °C (66 °F).

The relative humidity of the municipality and other climatic subzones of the municipality, is 85%, with monthly highs of 93% and lows of 74%.

The average wind speed at 7:00 am is 1.0 m/s, 13:00 2.7 m/s. At 19:00 it is 1.1 m/s, with a monthly maximum of 10.4 m/s; at 13:00 and monthly minimum 0 m/s (calm) at 19:00.

The municipality has annual precipitation of over 1,250 mm. The rainy months are March, April, May, October, November, December. The dry months are January, February, June, July, August, September. The total annual precipitation measurement at five stations is 1389.4 mm. The aridity index of 47.79 corresponds to Semi-arid. There is an average of 1560 sunshine hours per year (130 hours per month) and average evaporation of 1105.9 mm per year.

Fusagasugá, Valsalice

Climate chart (precipitation, max. and min. temperature)
J	F	M	A	M	J	J	A	S	O	N	D
121 25 15	110 25 16	155 25 16	139 25 16	149 24 16	74 24 16	52 24 16	44 25 16	94 25 16	147 24 16	158 24 16	130 24 16
- █ Average max. and min. temperatures in °C
- █ Precipitation totals in mm
- Source: IDEAM Weather
Imperial conversion
J	F	M	A	M	J	J	A	S	O	N	D
4.8 78 60	4.3 78 61	6.1 77 61	5.5 76 61	5.8 76 61	2.9 75 60	2 76 60	1.7 77 60	3.7 77 60	5.8 76 60	6.2 75 60	5.1 76 60
- █ Average max. and min. temperatures in °F
- █ Precipitation totals in inches

Climate data for Fusagasugá/Tibacuy (Tibacuy Gja), elevation 1,550 m (5,090 ft), (1971–2000)
Month	Jan	Feb	Mar	Apr	May	Jun	Jul	Aug	Sep	Oct	Nov	Dec	Year
Mean daily maximum °C (°F)	24.4 (75.9)	24.2 (75.6)	24.0 (75.2)	23.6 (74.5)	23.5 (74.3)	23.7 (74.7)	24.1 (75.4)	24.6 (76.3)	24.4 (75.9)	23.4 (74.1)	23.0 (73.4)	23.4 (74.1)	23.8 (74.8)
Daily mean °C (°F)	19.6 (67.3)	19.5 (67.1)	19.5 (67.1)	19.3 (66.7)	19.2 (66.6)	19.1 (66.4)	19.2 (66.6)	19.5 (67.1)	19.6 (67.3)	19.1 (66.4)	18.9 (66.0)	18.9 (66.0)	19.3 (66.7)
Mean daily minimum °C (°F)	15.3 (59.5)	15.3 (59.5)	15.7 (60.3)	15.7 (60.3)	15.6 (60.1)	15.3 (59.5)	14.9 (58.8)	15.2 (59.4)	15.3 (59.5)	15.3 (59.5)	15.2 (59.4)	15.0 (59.0)	15.3 (59.5)
Average precipitation mm (inches)	77.3 (3.04)	88.2 (3.47)	124.5 (4.90)	120.9 (4.76)	89.0 (3.50)	50.2 (1.98)	38.2 (1.50)	39.7 (1.56)	67.9 (2.67)	128.0 (5.04)	145.7 (5.74)	94.9 (3.74)	1,064.5 (41.91)
Average precipitation days	10	12	15	16	17	14	13	13	15	19	18	12	172
Average relative humidity (%)	78	79	80	82	83	79	75	73	73	79	83	80	79
Mean monthly sunshine hours	161.2	124.4	114.7	102.0	114.7	120.0	133.3	124.0	123.0	120.9	117.0	158.1	1,513.3
Mean daily sunshine hours	5.2	4.4	3.7	3.4	3.7	4.0	4.3	4.0	4.1	3.9	3.9	5.1	4.1
Source: Instituto de Hidrologia Meteorologia y Estudios Ambientales

Climate data for Fusagasugá, ITA Valsalice, elevation 1,460 m (4,790 ft) in the rural area 1981–2010 normals, (Note: Mean monthly maxima and minima (i.e. the expected highest and lowest temperature readings at any point during the year or given month) calculated based on data at said location from 1981 to 2010.)
Month	Jan	Feb	Mar	Apr	May	Jun	Jul	Aug	Sep	Oct	Nov	Dec	Year
Mean daily maximum °C (°F)	25.3 (77.5)	25.4 (77.7)	25.1 (77.2)	24.6 (76.3)	24.3 (75.7)	24.1 (75.4)	24.4 (75.9)	25.1 (77.2)	24.9 (76.8)	24.4 (75.9)	24.1 (75.4)	24.4 (75.9)	24.7 (76.5)
Daily mean °C (°F)	20.6 (69.1)	20.7 (69.3)	20.4 (68.7)	20.3 (68.5)	20.2 (68.4)	20.0 (68.0)	20.2 (68.4)	20.5 (68.9)	20.6 (69.1)	20.6 (69.1)	20.2 (68.4)	20.3 (68.5)	20.4 (68.7)
Mean daily minimum °C (°F)	15.4 (59.7)	15.9 (60.6)	16.0 (60.8)	16.1 (61.0)	15.9 (60.6)	15.6 (60.1)	15.5 (59.9)	15.7 (60.3)	15.7 (60.3)	15.6 (60.1)	15.5 (59.9)	15.5 (59.9)	15.7 (60.3)
Average precipitation mm (inches)	121.3 (4.78)	109.8 (4.32)	154.9 (6.10)	138.6 (5.46)	148.5 (5.85)	73.8 (2.91)	51.8 (2.04)	43.7 (1.72)	93.8 (3.69)	147.1 (5.79)	157.5 (6.20)	130.3 (5.13)	1,332.6 (52.46)
Average rainy days	13	13	16	19	20	17	17	13	16	19	19	14	191
Average relative humidity (%)	78	78	82	83	83	81	80	77	76	79	81	82	80
Mean daily sunshine hours	5.9	5.2	4.2	3.8	3.7	4.1	4.3	4.5	4.5	4.7	4.7	5.1	4.6
Source: Instituto de Hidrologia Meteorologia y Estudios Ambientales

Climate data for Fusagasugá, El Pinar, elevation 1,900 m (6,200 ft) in the rural area 1981–2010 normals,
Month	Jan	Feb	Mar	Apr	May	Jun	Jul	Aug	Sep	Oct	Nov	Dec	Year
Average precipitation mm (inches)	143.1 (5.63)	127.3 (5.01)	188.7 (7.43)	195.6 (7.70)	156.1 (6.15)	79.6 (3.13)	77.3 (3.04)	63.8 (2.51)	93.5 (3.68)	208.4 (8.20)	212.4 (8.36)	144.0 (5.67)	1,689.8 (66.53)
Average rainy days	13	13	17	20	21	19	19	18	17	21	20	16	212
Source: Instituto de Hidrologia Meteorologia y Estudios Ambientales

=== Water supply ===
The water supply is largely from local Emserfusa.

== Demography ==
The municipality has characterized due to its demographic explosion, factors that incide are climate and location near the capital Bogotá.

According of 2005 census development by Departamento Nacional de Estadistica the population is 107,259 inhabitants. 85,008 in the urban town and 22,251 in the rural zone. The proportion of men is 48.1% and the women is 51.9%. Until 2011, its population is growing to annual rate of 2.4%, this indicator is higher than the departamental average of 1.9%. 2018 census recorded

Population census
Year	Pop.	±% p.a.
1987E	63,886	—
1993C	82,003	+4.25%
2005C	108,949	+2.40%
2015E	134,523	+2.13%
2020E	154,423	+2.80%
Note: Municipality 193.9 km2

Population census
Year	Pop.	±% p.a.
1985C	41,571	—
1993C	57,915	+4.23%
2005C	86,878	+3.44%
2018C	114,722	+2.16%
Note: Urban town 14.4 km2

=== Religion ===
Fusagasuga has been mainly Christian.

== Government ==
The City Council consists of 17 members. The current mayor is Jario Hortúa. Fusagasugá has tended to be a stronghold of the Liberal Party, which has controlled the city's mayoralty most of the time since 1986.

Electoral results on 2019.
Political Party	2019	
Political Party	Votes	Councillors
"U" Party	9 061	3
Democratic Center Party	6 666	2
Liberal Party	5 418	2
Conservative Party	5 019	2
Green Party	4 836	2
Radical Change Party	4 346	1
Alternative indigenous and social party	3 807	1
Humane Colombia, UP, PDA coalition	3 134	1
MIRA Party	2 843	1
Independent Social Alliance Party	2 353	1

== Administrative Division ==
Fusagasugá is administratively divided into 6 communes and 5 townships (countryside or rural division), which are further subdivided in wards (barrios) and municipal rural settlement (rural district or vereda). The total area spreads 206 square kilometres (20,600 ha), 13.03 km^{2} (1,303 ha) are urban zone and 190.98 km^{2} (19,098 ha) are rural zone. There is a difference and crossing of boundaries between the different jurisdictions of the neighborhoods, the veredas and the Communal Councils.

=== Communes ===
Urban population in Fusagasugá 93,614 (est. 2015)
Population distribution by Urban
Centro	12,985	(13.87%)	
Norte	18,612	(19.88%)	
Oriental	15,059	(16.09%)	
Occidental	14,482	(15.47%)	
Sur Oriental	17,670	(18.88%)	
Sur Occidental	14,806	(15.82%)	

The urban zone has 26 wards (barrios) which have not yet been delimited. In these wards have been developed 226 urbanistic projects. The urban zone spreads 13.03 km^{2} (1,303 ha). Centro Commune has 0.63 km^{2} (63 ha), Norte 1.48 km^{2} (148 ha), Oriental 1.54 km^{2} (154 ha), Occidental 4.08 km^{2} (408 ha), Sur Oriental 1.49 km^{2} (149 ha) and Sur Occidental 3.81 km^{2} (381 ha).

1. Centro: Santander, Emilio Sierra, Centro, Olaya, Luxemburgo, Potosí. 0.63 km^{2} (63 ha). 12,985 inhabitants. Density: 20,610/km^{2} (206.1/ha)
2. Norte: Barrio El Progreso, Barrio José Antonio Galán, Barrio La Cabaña, Barrio La Florida, Barrio Los Andes, Conjunto Cerrado Quinta De Los Rosales, Conjunto Cerrado San Carlos, Conjunto Los Claveles, Urbanización Andalucía (Gaitán III), Urbanización Buenavista, Urbanización Carlos Lleras, Urbanización Ciudadela Campestre Villa Natalia, Urbanización Ciudadela Campestre Villa Natalia II, Urbanización El Carmen, Urbanización El Edén, Urbanización El Lucero, Urbanización El Porvenir Asbembapor (Norte), Urbanización El Rosal, Urbanización Gaitán, Urbanización Gaitán II Etapa, Urbanización La Esmeralda I Etapa, Urbanización La Esmeralda II Etapa, Urbanización La Esperanza, Urbanización La Independencia, Urbanización La Nueva Esperanza, Urbanización La Victoria, Urbanización Las Margaritas, Urbanización Los Fundadores, Urbanización Los Guaduales, Urbanización Mi Tesoro, Urbanización Monteverde, Urbanización Nueva Jerusalén, Urbanización San Antonio, Urbanización Santa Librada, Urbanización Simón Bolívar, Urbanización Villa Armerita, Urbanización Villa De San Diego (II Norte), Urbanización Villa Luz, Urbanización Villa Rosalía. 1.48 km^{2} (148 ha). Norte: 18,612 inhabitants. Density: 12,580/km^{2} (125.8/ha)
3. Oriental: Barrio Antonio Nariño, Barrio Cedritos, Barrio Coburgo, Barrio Pekín, Condominio Parque La Colina, Conjunto Altos De Cedritos, Conjunto Cerrado El Bosque, Conjunto Cerrado El Mirador de Pekín, Conjunto Cerrado Paraíso de Pekín, Conjunto Cerrado Rincón de Pekín, Conjunto Cerrado Socaire, Conjunto María Isabel, Conjunto Residencial El Remanso, Conjunto Residencial Recreo De Los Sauces, Conjunto Residencial Villa Mayorga, Sector Bellavista, Sector La Palma, Sector Sauces, Urbanización Altos De Pekín, Urbanización Bella Vista, Urbanización Bosque Bonnet, Urbanización Casona De Pekín, Urbanización Colinas De Baravia, Urbanización El Mirador De Bonnet, Urbanización El Naranjal, Urbanización El Tejar Plan De Vivienda Municipal, Urbanización La Alejandra, Urbanización Los Robles, Urbanización Paraíso De Los Sauces, Urbanización Pekín (Instituto Crédito Territorial), Urbanización Santa María De Los Ángeles, Urbanización Villa Aranzazu, Urbanización Villa de los Sutagaos.
4. Occidental: Barrio Antiguo Balmoral, barrio Manila, barrio Piedra Grande, barrio San Mateo, Conjunto San José Piedra Grande, condominio Casa De Campo (Los Ocobos) I Etapa, condominio Santa Ana Reservado, conjunto Altos De Marsella Novelda I Etapa, conjunto Balcones De Marsella, conjunto Cerrado Acapulco, conjunto Cerrado Bosques De La Cañada, conjunto Cerrado Comarca Española, conjunto Cerrado El Caribe, conjunto Cerrado El Nidito, conjunto Cerrado El Nogal, conjunto Cerrado El Recreo De Los Alpes, conjunto Cerrado La Cañada, conjunto Cerrado La Fontana, conjunto Cerrado Rincón de Capri, conjunto Cerrado Santorini, conjunto Cerrado Villa Lorena, conjunto Cerrado Villa Nice, conjunto Cerrado Villas Del Mediterráneo, conjunto El Portal, conjunto Multifamiliar Palacio De Piedra Grande, conjunto Parque Residencial Getsemaní, conjunto Quintas De Santa María, conjunto Residencial Altos De Manila, conjunto Residencial Aranjuez, conjunto Residencial El Comboy, conjunto Residencial El Manantial, conjunto Residencial Palmas de Hupanel, conjunto Residencial Quintas de Manila, conjunto Residencial Santa Helena, conjunto Residencial Teresita I Y II, conjunto Residencial Teresita III, conjunto Residencial Terranova, conjunto Residencial Terrazas Del Manila, conjunto Residencial Villa Milena, conjunto Residencial Villas De Manila, conjunto San Nicolás, conjunto Santa Ana Campestre I Y II Etapa, conjunto Santa Ana Campestre III Y IV Etapa, conjunto Siboney 2000, conjunto Terrazas De Manila II Etapa, conjunto Villa Andrea, Manzana B Lotes 1 Y 2 Palmas De Hupanel, Multifamiliar Balcones De Balmoral, Multifamiliar El Caribe, San Nicolás Reservado, Sector El Caney, Sector El Caribe, Sector Sabaneta, Sector Triangulo De Desarrollo, Unidad De Actuación Urbanística No. 4, Urbanización Bonanza, Urbanización Ciudad Jardín II (Piedra Grande), Urbanización Ciudadela Cootransfusa, Urbanización Ciudalcampo, Urbanización El Encanto, Urbanización El Portal De San José, Urbanización Espartillal, Urbanización Fontanar, Urbanización La Abadía De San Jorge, Urbanización La María, Urbanización La Marsella, Urbanización La Villa de Sion, Urbanización Mandalay, Urbanización Nuevo Balmoral I Sector, Urbanización Nuevo Balmoral II Sector, Urbanización Palermo, Urbanización Porvenir (Manila), Urbanización Quinta Balmoral, Urbanización Rinconcito De Manila, Urbanización San Jorge, Urbanización San Nicolás, Urbanización Santa Anita, Urbanización Santa Cecilia, Urbanización Santa Clara, Urbanización Villa Adriana, Urbanización Villa Alix, Urbanización Villa Clara, Urbanización Villa Country, Urbanización Villa Lenny, Urbanización Villa María.4.08 km^{2} (408 ha). inhabitants 14,482 Density: 3,550/km^{2} (35.50/ha)
5. Sur Oriental: Barrio Balmoral, Barrio Fusacatán, Barrio Jaime Pardo Leal, Barrio Los Comuneros, Barrio Obrero, Barrio Pedro Pablo Bello, Conjunto Cerrado Paraíso De Balmoral, Conjunto Cerrado Santa Catalina, Conjunto Cerrado Zaira Alejandra, Conjunto Residencial La Arboleda, Conjunto Residencial Santo Domingo, Multifamiliar Altos De Fusa, Sector Mosqueral, Urbanización Aires del Quininí (Asociación De Vivienda Popular ADEVIP), Urbanización Akrópolis, Urbanización Bosques Del Oriente Etapas I Y II, Urbanización Camino Real I, Urbanización Camino Real II Y III, Urbanización El Mirador, Urbanización Florida Blanca, Urbanización Fusacatán III, Urbanización La Glorieta, Urbanización La Macarena, Urbanización Las Américas, Urbanización Las Delicias, Urbanización Managua, Urbanización Prados De Altagracia Plan De Vivienda Municipal, Urbanización Prados de Bethel, Urbanización San Fernando, Urbanización San Fernando II Etapa, Urbanización Santa Bárbara, Urbanización Santa Rosa, Urbanización Santo Domingo, Urbanización Toluca, Urbanización Villa Lady. 1.49 km^{2} (149 ha). Sur Oriental 17,670 Density: 11,860/km^{2} (118.6/ha)
6. Sur Occidental: Barrio La Venta (La Pampa), Condominio Campestre La Pradera, Conjunto Campestre Belmira, Conjunto Cerrado Alhambra (La Venta), Conjunto Cerrado Balcones De San José, Conjunto Cerrado Brisas De Miramonte, Conjunto Cerrado La Alameda, Conjunto Cerrado Las Heliconias, Conjunto Cerrado Llano Largo, Conjunto Cerrado Llano Verde, Conjunto Cerrado Pampa Campestre, Conjunto Cerrado Poblado Real, Conjunto Cerrado Villa Celeste II Etapa, Conjunto Cerrado Villa Celeste Reservado, Conjunto Cerrado Villas De La Pampa, Conjunto El Portal De Llano Largo, Conjunto Llano Alto, Conjunto Recreacional Y Habitacional Las Palmas, Conjunto Residencial Andaluz, Conjunto Residencial Asoveinte, Conjunto Residencial Caracolí, Conjunto Residencial Fénix, Conjunto Residencial Maguare, Conjunto Residencial Y Comercial San Martin De Los Olivos, Sector Cucharal Urbano, Urbanización Altamira, Urbanización Cádiz, Urbanización Caminos De Llano Largo (Loteo San Francisco), Urbanización Ciudad Eben Ezer Plan De Vivienda Municipal, Urbanización Ciudad Jardín (La Venta), Urbanización Ciudadela Comfenalco, Urbanización Conjunto Residencial 15 De Mayo, Urbanización El Futuro, Urbanización El Oasis, Urbanización El Recreo (Nuevo Milenio), Urbanización La Gran Colombia, Urbanización La Nueva Campiña, Urbanización La Primavera, Urbanización Las Brisas (Asociación De Vivienda Comunitaria), Urbanización Leidy Di (Asociación De Vivienda Comunitaria), Urbanización Llano Alto, Urbanización Llano Largo, Urbanización Llano Verde, Urbanización Los Cámbulos, Urbanización Los Girasoles, Urbanización Parques De Occidente, Urbanización Paseo Real, Urbanización Pedregal De San Ángel, Urbanización San Diego (La Venta), Urbanización San Marcos, Urbanización Villa Celeste, Urbanización Villa De La Esperanza (Vivienda de Interés Social), Urbanización Villa Patricia, Urbanización Villa Rosita. 3.81 km^{2} (381 ha).1.54 km^{2} (154 ha). 15,059 inhabitants. Density: 9,780/km^{2} (97.8/ha) Sur Occidental 14,806 Density: 3,886/km^{2} (38.86/ha)

Commune	Population	Area (km^{2})	Density (/km^{2})
Centro	12985	0.63	20,610
Norte	18612	1.48	12,580
Oriental	15059	1.54	9,780
Occidental	14482	4.08	3,550
Sur Oriental	17670	1.49	11,860
Sur Occidental	14806	3.81	3,886

=== Rural Division ===
Rural population in Fusagasugá 27,921 (est. 2015)
Population distribution by Rural
Norte	4,608	(16.50%)
Oriental	3,060	(10.96%)
Suroriental	6,976	(24.98%)
Suroccidental	8,690	(31.12%)
Occidental	4,587	(16.43%)

The rural zone has divided on 6 districts, and 38 subdistricts. 190.98 square kilometres (19,098 ha).

1. Norte: Los Robles, San Rafael, La Aguadita, Bermajal, Tierra Negra, Parte Piamonte, Parte Usatama. 34.79 square kilometres (3,479 ha).
2. Oriental: El Jordán, La Palma, Pekín, Sauces, Bethel, Mosqueral, La Venta. 17.94 square kilometres (1,794 ha)
3. Sur Oriental: El Carmen, Santa Lucía, Batán, El Guavio, Bóchica, Sardinas, Mesitas, Palacios, La Isla, Guayabal, Espinalito, el Placer y Mosqueral. 59.91 square kilometres (5,991 ha).
4. Sur Occidental: San Antonio, Santa María, La Puerta, El Triunfo. 48.76 square kilometres (4,876 ha)
5. Occidental: Parte De Usatama, Parte Piamonte, Bosachoque, El Resguardo, Cucharal, La Venta, Novillero, Viena. 29.59 square kilometres (2,959 ha).

Commune	Population	Area (km^{2})	Density (/km^{2})
Norte	4608	34.79	132.45
Oriental	3060	17.94	170.6
Sur Oriental	6976	59.91	116.441
Sur Occidental	8690	48.76	178.22
Occidental	4587	29.59	155.02

== Economy ==
In 2007 the municipality ranked the tenth place on department according to its economy. The GDP estimated at 2007 is $544,984 million. The majority of the regional economy is made up of agriculture and construction services. Aside from these sectors, there has been rapid growth in the service industry because of the strengthening in the sectors of education, health, recreation, and tourism. Local government policies to support agrotechnology have fostered short-term, local development. The municipality has nowadays the third category.

Altagracia	Spanish Neighbors	Natives
1580 (Foundation)	14	790
1776 (Extinction)	988	78

Fusagasugá	Population	Budget	
Fusagasugá	1776 (Founded)	60	-
1918	18,856	-	
1955	27,000	1,105,000	
1987	56,536	199,852,200	
2015	134,523	117,124,852,662	
Source: DANE

== Education ==
In 2003 there were 97 schools, 68% are public and 32% private. 54 schools are in urban zone and 43 in rural zone. In the city there are the Universidad de Cundinamarca, the School of Public Service ESAP, the Police School, ICSEF, the Universidad Santo Tomás and Universidad Antonio Nariño. There are also Servicio Nacional de Aprendizaje SENA, and 15 non-formal or informal private educational establishments.

== Tourism ==
Due to its warm climate, Fusagasugá attracts many tourists with many hotels, resorts, pool parks, and cabins. The Pan-American highway goes through Fusagasugá's territory. In order to travel to other Colombian cities in the south-west, such as Ibagué, Neiva, or Cali, it is necessary to pass through Fusagasugá when traveling from the north.

From the highway, you can see greenhouses, plant and flower stores, handcrafted rustic furniture stores, and local restaurants.

== Sports ==
Fusagasugá was once home to the soccer team Expreso Rojo, which plays in the Colombian second division. Cycling is a renowned sport in the Fusagasugá. Remarkable growth in roller-skating has happened within the past few decades, mainly among children.

== Born in Fusagasugá ==
- Julio César Cadena, former professional cyclist
- Víctor Hugo González, former professional cyclist
- Pablo Wilches, former professional cyclist
- Luis Herrera, former professional cyclist

== See also ==
- Sutagao
