= Sutagao people =

Sutagao
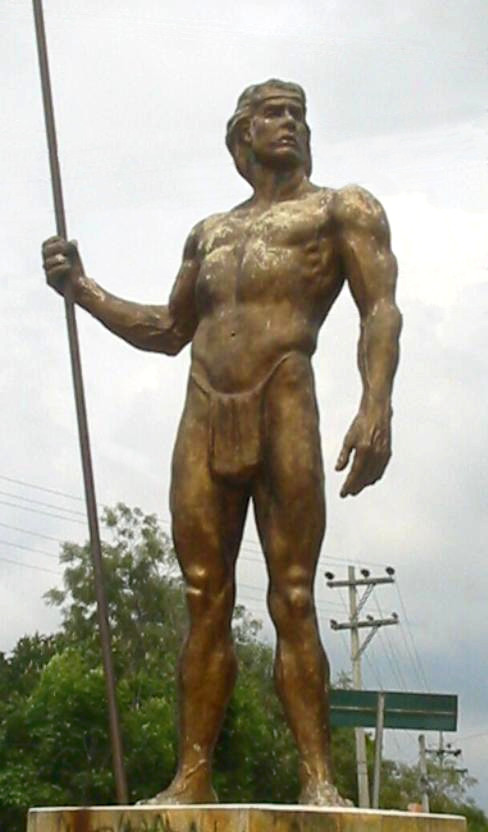
- Sculpture of a Sutagao standing at the entrance of Fusagasugá

Total population
- 85 (1760)

Regions with significant populations
- Cundinamarca, Colombia

Languages
- Unclassified Sutagao language

Religion
- Traditional religion, Catholicism

Related ethnic groups
- Muisca, Guayupe, Panche

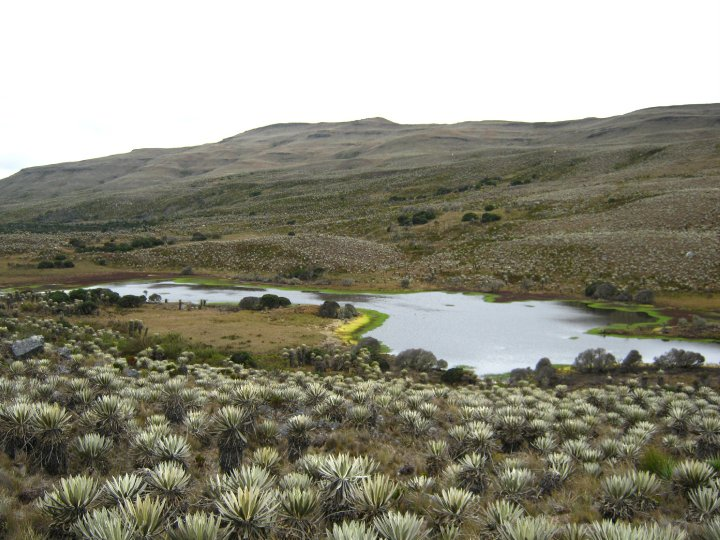
The Sumapaz Páramo, the largest páramo in the world, was home to the Sutagao

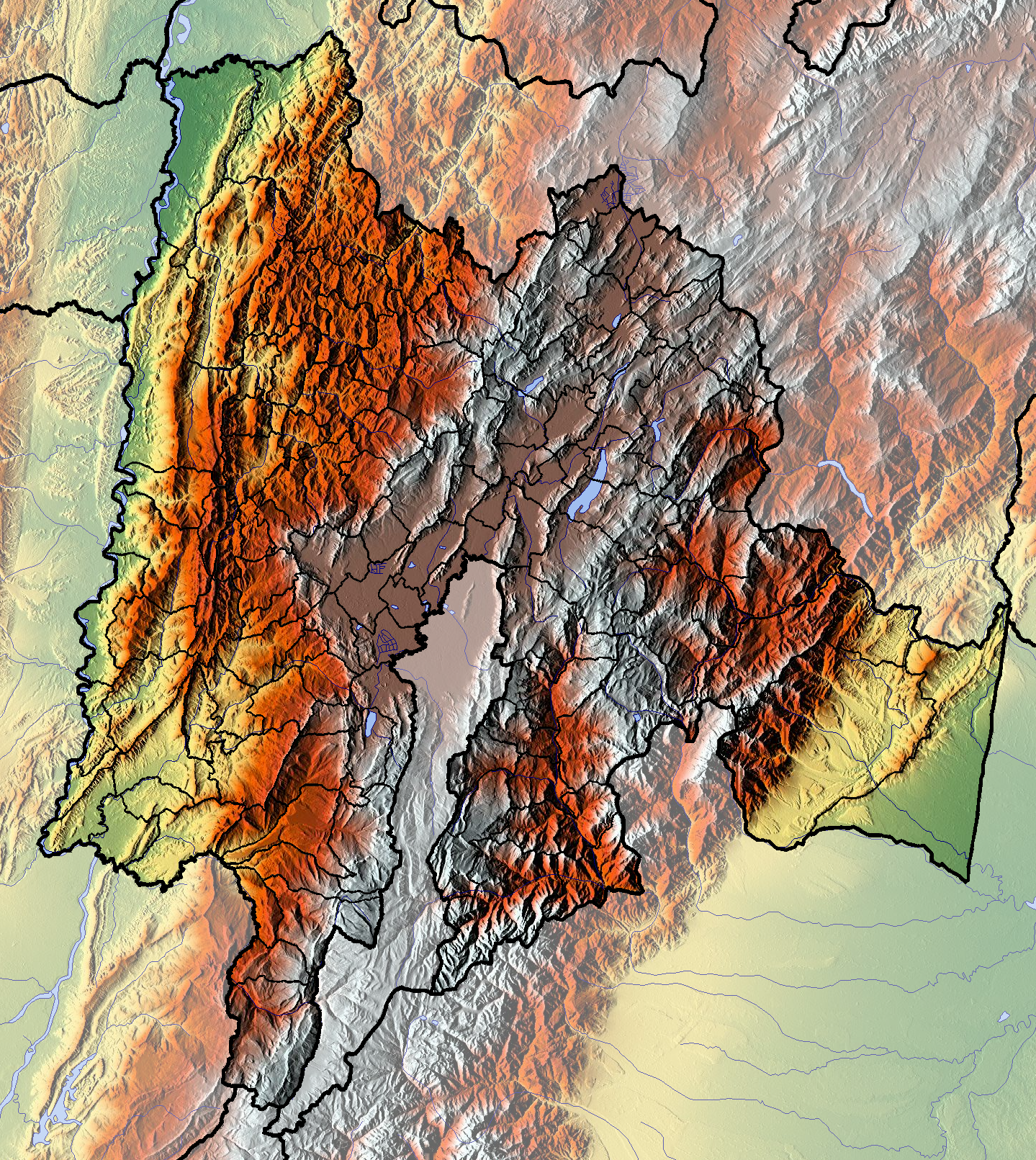
Topographical map of Cundinamarca. The Sutagao lived in the south of the department, including the greyed out southern Bogotá area; Sumapaz

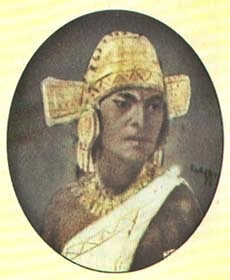
Saguamanchica, zipa of the Muisca, conquered the Sutagao around 1470 in the Battle of Pasca

The Sutagao are the indigenous people from the region of Fusagasugá, Bogotá savanna, Cundinamarca, Colombia. Knowledge about the Sutagao has been provided by scholar Lucas Fernández de Piedrahita.

== Etymology ==
The name Sutagao is derived from the Chibcha words Su(t)á; "Sun" and gao; "son"; "Sons of the Sun".

=== Municipalities belonging to Sutagao territories ===
The Sutagao was a relatively small Indigenous group that lived between the Sumapaz Páramo and the Pasca River.

Name	Department	Altitude (m) urban centre	Map
Fusagasugá	Cundinamarca	1756	
Arbeláez	Cundinamarca	1417	
Pandi	Cundinamarca	1600	
San Bernardo	Cundinamarca	1600	
Venecia	Cundinamarca	1423	
Cabrera	Cundinamarca	2560	
Sumapaz	Bogotá	3500	

== History ==
Before the Spanish conquest, the Sutagao were in conflict with the Muisca to the northeast. Zipa Saguamanchica conquered the Sutagao around 1470 when the cacique of the Sutagao lost the Battle of Pasca. Conquistador Hernán Pérez de Quesada, brother of Gonzalo Jiménez de Quesada submitted the Sutagao to the new rule of the New Kingdom of Granada.

The Sutagao inhabited the region until a new town was founded by Bernardino Albornoz between 5 and 13 February in 1592. During the visit of Miguel de Ibarra there were 759 Indigenous people residing in Fusagasugá. When Aróstequi arrived in February 1760, the Indigenous population had dwindled to 85, and there were 644 new settlers divided among 109 families.

== See also ==
- Muisca
- Guayupe, Panche
