= Cabrera, Cundinamarca =

Cabrera
- Municipality and town
- Flag Coat of arms

- Location of the municipality and town inside Cundinamarca Department of Colombia

- Location in Colombia
- Coordinates: 3°58′41″N 74°29′9″W
- Country: Colombia
- Department: Cundinamarca
- Elevation: 2,560 m (8,400 ft)
- Time zone: UTC-5 (Colombia Standard Time)

Cabrera is a town and municipality in Sumapaz Province in Cundinamarca Department, Colombia. The town was founded in the 1920s. It is located 4 hours from Bogotá and its area is known by the production of livestock, fruit and more recently the best variety of beans in the world in the mid-1990s.
