= Sumapaz Province =

Sumapaz Province Provincia de Sumapaz
- Province
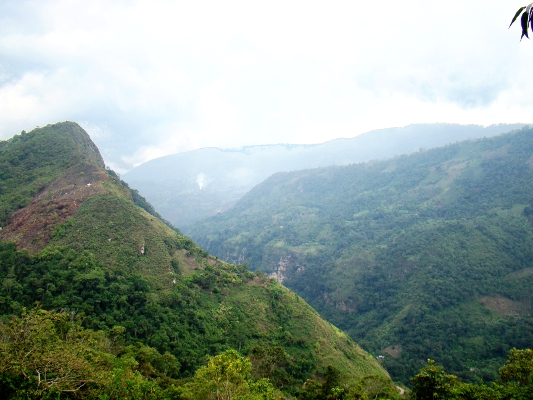
- Venecia
- Etymology: Sumapaz Páramo
- Location of Sumapaz Province in Colombia
- Coordinates: 4°20′14″N 74°21′52″W
- Country: Colombia
- Department: Cundinamarca
- Capital: Fusagasugá
- Municipalities: 10
- Time zone: UTC−05:00 (COT)
- Indigenous groups: Sutagao; Muisca

Sumapaz Province is one of the 15 provinces in the Cundinamarca Department, Colombia.
