= Venecia, Cundinamarca =

Venecia
- Municipality and town
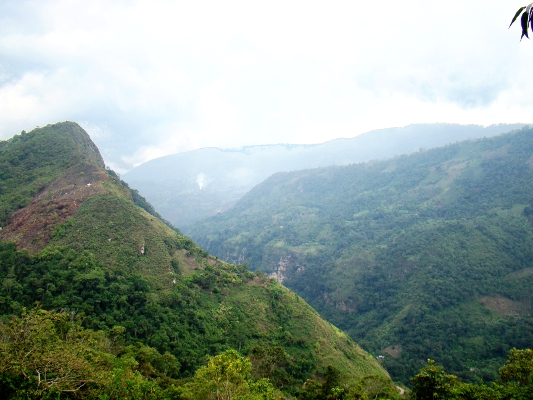

- Flag Coat of arms

- Location of the municipality and town inside Cundinamarca Department of Colombia

- Location in Colombia
- Coordinates: 4°5′19″N 74°28′39″W
- Country: Colombia
- Department: Cundinamarca
- Elevation: 1,423 m (4,669 ft)

Population (2015)
  - Total: 4,060
- Time zone: UTC-5 (Colombia Standard Time)

Venecia (Spanish pronunciation: [beˈnesja]), previously known as Ospina Perez is a Colombian town and municipality in the Cundinamarca Department.
