= Battle of Tocarema =

1538 battle during the Spanish conquest of the Muisca

- Part of Spanish conquest of New Granada
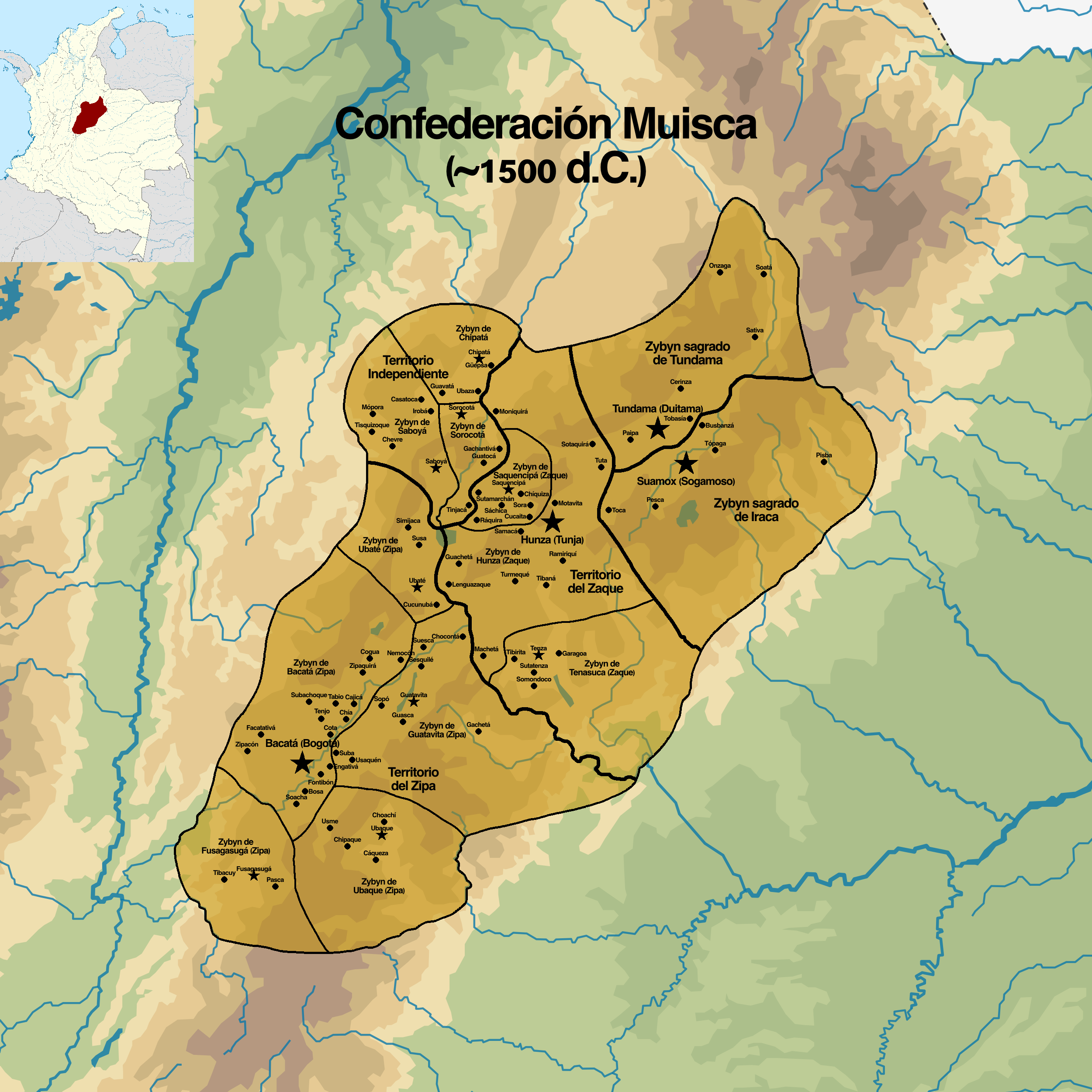
- Map of the Muisca Confederation; Tocarema is at the border of Muisca & Panche
Date	19–20 August 1538
Location	Tocarema, Panche territory 4°45′02″N 74°26′05″W
Result	Spanish and Muisca victory
Territorial changes	Panche partially submitted to Spanish colonial reign

Belligerents
(Spanish Empire) Spanish conquistadors Zipazgo of the southern Muisca	Caciques of the Panche

Commanders and leaders
Gonzalo de Quesada; Juan de St. Martín; Juan de Céspedes; Pedro de Valenzuela; Sagipa	Anolaima, Cochima, Lutaima, Lichinú, Ibiantor, Calandaima, Iqueima, Tocarema, Buluduaima, Matima, & Siquima

Strength
50-100 Spanish; 4,000-20,000 guecha	unknown

Casualties and losses
Fatalities: ~100 guecha Wounded: many Muisca; ~30 Spanish	unknown
- Location of the battle

The Battle of Tocarema (Spanish: Batalla de Tocarema) was fought between an alliance of the troops of Spanish conquistador Gonzalo Jiménez de Quesada and zipa of the Muisca Sagipa of the southern Muisca Confederation and the indigenous Panche. The battle took place on the afternoon of August 19 and the morning of August 20, 1538 in the vereda Tocarema of Cachipay, Cundinamarca, Colombia and resulted in a victory for the Spanish and Muisca, when captains Juan de Céspedes and Juan de Sanct Martín commanded two flanks of the conquistadors.

The victory of the Spanish colonial powers over the Panche did not completely suppress the resistance of the indigenous peoples from the western parts of Cundinamarca. Later conquest expeditions were needed to fully subdue the western neighbours of the Muisca, described by early Spanish chroniclers Pedro de Aguado, Pedro Simón, Juan Freyle, and Lucas Fernández de Piedrahita as bellicose and cannibalistic.

== Background ==
Battle of Tocarema and other battles around the Bogotá savanna

At the Spanish conquest, the central region of the Eastern Ranges of the Colombian Andes was inhabited by various indigenous groups. The Altiplano Cundiboyacense, the high plateau of the Eastern Andes, and surrounding valleys as the Tenza Valley, were populated by the Muisca, with neighbouring communities to the west (Muzo), southwest (Panche) and south (Sutagao). The Muisca era was preceded by the Herrera Period, defined from 800 BCE to 800 AD, which was the first ceramic stage of the pre-Columbian era. The oldest dated pottery of the Eastern Ranges has been found in Tocarema, carbon dated at 750 BCE. According to early Spanish chroniclers, mainly Pedro Simón, Lucas Fernández de Piedrahita, Juan Freyle in his work El Carnero, and Gonzalo Jiménez de Quesada, the main conquistador of the region who kept a diary and possibly wrote Epítome de la conquista del Nuevo Reino de Granada, the Panche were the main enemies of the Muisca. They described that the Panche performed various invasions into Muisca territory.

=== Panche and Muisca ===
The Panche were a Cariban-speaking, according to chronicler Pedro de Aguado cannibalistic, people who inhabited the lower altitude western flanks of the Eastern Ranges between the Altiplano in the east and the Magdalena River in the west. Numerous names of their communities and caciques are kept as names of municipalities, rivers and subdivisions in the region; Ambalema, Conchima, Jáquima, Nimaima, Anapoima, Calandaima, Otaima, Panchigua, Abea or Anéa, Chapayma, Lachimí, Sasaima, Anolaima, Chapamillo, Luchenta, Síquima, Bituima, Guacan, Lumbí, Suitama, Bucaneme, Guataquí, Lutaima, Tocaima, Bulandaima, Gualí, Manoa, Tocarema, Calaima, Honda, Marquiton, Calamoima, Iqueima, and Matima. The southern neighbours of the Panche were the Pijao. At the time of the conquest, the Panche numbered approximately 30,000.

The Muisca were a diverse group of native people who spoke Muysccubun, a language classified as part of the Chibchan languages. Their territory stretched across an area of approximately 25,000 square kilometres (9,700 sq mi). The name Muisca Confederation has been given to their social organisation of various caciques, of which the iraca of Suamox, tundama of Tundama, zaque of Hunza, and zipa of Bacatá were the most important. The Muisca, meaning "people" or "person" in Muysccubun, embraced a subsistence economy based on trade and the extraction of salt, giving them the name "The Salt People".

=== Spanish conquistadors ===
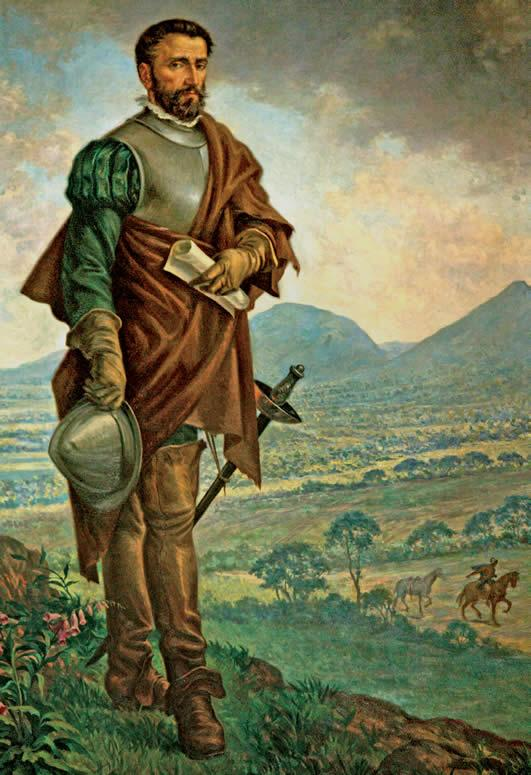
Gonzalo Jiménez de Quesada was the main conquistador of the Colombian Eastern Andes and led his troops to submit the Panche at the Battle of Tocarema, two weeks after founding the city of Santafe de Bogotá

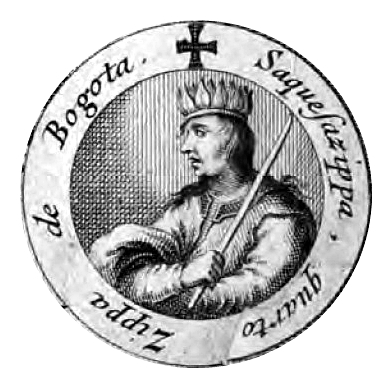
Sagipa, also called Zaquesazipa, was the last zipa of the Muisca, who played a crucial role in the Battle of Tocarema

The Spanish conquistadors had conquered the Tairona at the Caribbean coast and Rodrigo de Bastidas with his captains, one of which was Juan de Céspedes, founded Santa Marta and Taganga in July 1525. During the next ten years, the harbour of the city at the foot of the Sierra Nevada de Santa Marta was the most important access point for ships from Spain. In the tropical lands of the coastal city, the Spanish were informed by the indigenous people that deep in the then unknown Andes, a "city of gold" would exist, which formed the basis for the mythical El Dorado. In April 1536, conquistador Gonzalo Jiménez de Quesada set up an expedition into the mainland of what later would become Colombia, where he gathered various young men for the quest of El Dorado. His brother Hernán Pérez de Quesada and other Spanish soldiers, Juan de Céspedes, Juan de Sanct Martín, Pedro Fernández de Valenzuela, Lázaro Fonte, Antonio de Lebrija, Juan de(l) Junco, Gonzalo Suárez Rendón, Gonzalo Macías, Martín Galeano, Hernán Venegas Carrillo, Juan Tafur, Ortún Velázquez de Velasco, Bartolomé Camacho Zambrano and around 700 others, left the relative safety of the coast for what would become the hardest expedition of the main conquests of the Americas. Jiménez de Quesada organised two groups; one ascending the Magdalena River with brigs, and one regiment going over land. The captains heading the brigs were Francisco Gómez del Corral, Antonio Díaz de Cardoso and Juan de Albarracín.

When the Spanish reached the Sierras del Opón, to the south of the newly founded city of La Tora, they found salt loaves that were of much higher quality than the salt from the Caribbean coast. Asking the natives who transported the salt, they told the Spanish and their interpreters, the salt came from an advanced and rich civilisation high up in the Andes to the south. This drew the Spanish into the mountains, away from the Magdalena River, a journey that became known as the Camino de la Sal ("The Salt Route"). In early March 1537, almost a year after the original group of more than 700 soldiers left Santa Marta, the due to diseases, hunger, native attacks, and jaguars heavily reduced army reached Muisca territory in Chipatá, in south of the current department Santander. The indigenous people provided the Spanish with cotton mantles against the cold climate of the Altiplano. Gonzalo Jiménez de Quesada continued the expedition south towards the domain of the zipa of Bacatá. The troops entered the Bogotá savanna, the flatlands in the southwest of the Altiplano, at the end of March 1537 and the catholic conquistadors spent the Holy Week of that year in Chía, the settlement north of present-day Bogotá named after Moon goddess Chía. From here, they went southwest to Muequetá, the seat of zipa Tisquesusa. Tisquesusa was informed before that he would "die, bathing in his own blood" by strange light-skinned men and was lethally hurt by the Spanish who defeated him and his guecha warriors in April 1537.

The Spanish set up camp in Bosa, from which Gonzalo Jiménez de Quesada organised various new expeditions in the search of El Dorado. He sent conquistador Juan de Céspedes to the south, his brother Hernán back to the north and he himself with a regiment of other conquerors towards the Tenza Valley, where he encountered the rich emerald lands of Somondoco and Chivor. After defeating other important leaders of the Muisca in Hunza (Quemuenchatocha) and Suamox (Sugamuxi) in the second half of 1537, he returned to the Bogotá savanna, where the city of Santafe de Bogotá was founded as the capital of the New Kingdom of Granada on August 6, 1538. Here, the leadership of the southern Muisca was taken over by Sagipa, the brother of Tisquesusa. This was against the traditions of heritage of rule of the Muisca, where normally the eldest son of the sister of the former zipa would inherit the leadership. The Panche were informed by the new rule of the Spanish on the Bogotá savanna and launched an attack close to the western settlement of Zipacón.

== Battle ==
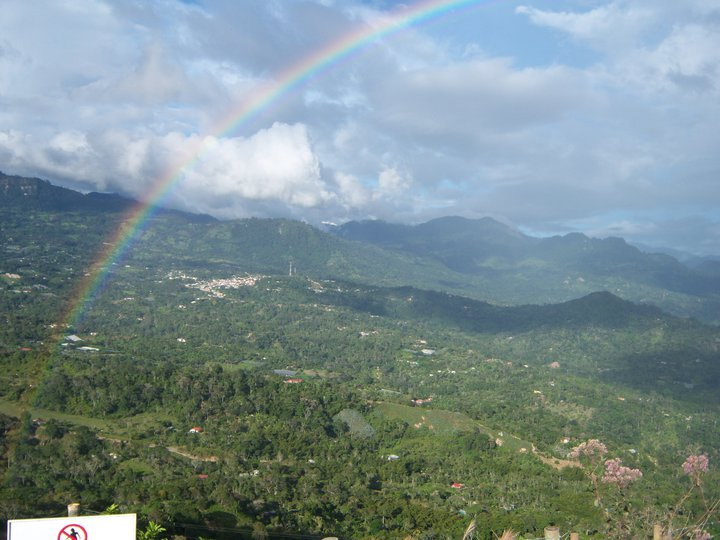
View of Cachipay, Cundinamarca, the area of the Battle of Tocarema

Sagipa and the Spanish conquistadors agreed they had to submit the eternal enemies of the Muisca, and on August 19, 1538, two weeks after the foundation of Bogotá, the alliance of Muisca and Spanish went west into Panche terrain. The number of Spanish soldiers are reported between fifty and "not more than 100", while the Muisca warriors numbered between 4,000 and 20,000. The Muisca launched the attack on the Panche, while the Spanish were hiding in the vicinity of the battlefield, a strategy planned by Gonzalo García Zorro. The battle was fought in Tocarema, between present-day Cachipay and Anolaima. The Panche used their terrain to their advantage, taking position on the hills and launching poisoned arrows at their indigenous neighbours. The guecha warriors suffered around one hundred losses in fatalities, and counted many more hurt warriors. The Spanish conquistadors advanced, and 30 of their men were hurt by the battle; none of them were lethally. Night fell, and the Panche retreated.

The next morning, on August 20, the troops of Sagipa advanced into the area held by the Panche, and the warriors of the latter attacked the Muisca in open terrain. At that moment, the Spanish conquistadors went out of hiding with their cavalry and weapons. The right flank was commanded by Juan de Sanct Martín, and the left flank by Juan de Céspedes. Pedro Fernández de Valenzuela also participated in the battle. Juan de Sanct Martín killed the main cacique of the Panche in a fight where de Sanct Martín was wounded, and together with the guecha, the alliance defeated the Panche. The Spanish conquistadors and Muisca returned to the Bogotá savanna and celebrated their victory with festivities.

== Aftermath ==
The spear in the coat of arms of Viotá symbolises the resistance by the Panche

The alliance of Sagipa with the Spanish did not last for long. After Gonzalo Jiménez de Quesada with the conquistadors Nikolaus Federmann and Sebastián de Belalcázar, who had reached the Bogotá savanna from the east and south respectively, left for Spain in the spring of 1539, he left the reign of the New Kingdom of Granada in the hands of his brother. Hernán Pérez de Quesada threatened Sagipa to give up his valuables to the Spanish invaders and when the zipa did not comply in the eyes of the Europeans, de Quesada ordered Juan de Céspedes and Juan de Sanct Martín to torture the Muisca leader by cutting and burning the soles of his feet.

The Panche continued to pose resistance to the Spanish Crown and new conquest expeditions into their territories were organised by Pérez de Quesada. He sent his captain Hernán Venegas Carrillo towards the west in August 1543. Venegas Carrillo passed through Chaguaní, Bituima, Apulo, and Tocaima, and became the colonial founder of the last three villages. The Spanish established three encomiendas in the Panche territories; Honda, Calamoyma, and Chapayma.

=== Battle of Tocarema in Muisca history ===
History of the Muisca
Altiplano	Muisca	Art	Architecture	Astronomy	Cuisine	El Dorado	Subsistence	Women	Conquest

== See also ==
- Spanish conquest of the Muisca
- Muisca warfare
- History of Colombia
- Battle of Chocontá
- Battle of Pasca

== Bibliography ==
- Argüello García, Pedro María (2015), Subsistence economy and chiefdom emergence in the Muisca area. A study of the Valle de Tena (PhD) (PDF) (PhD), University of Pittsburgh, pp. 1–193
- Daza, Blanca Ysabel (2013), Historia del proceso de mestizaje alimentario entre Colombia y España - History of the integration process of foods between Colombia and Spain (PhD) (PhD), Barcelona, Spain: Universitat de Barcelona, pp. 1–494
- Fernández de Piedrahita, Lucas (1676), Historia general de las conquistas del Nuevo Reyno de Granada - Parte 2 (PDF), pp. 189–397, archived from the original (PDF) on 2014-06-11
- Ocampo López, Javier (2004), Tesoros legendarios de Colombia y el mundo, Plaza y Janes Editores Colombia s.a., pp. 1–351, ISBN 978-958-14-0360-8
- De Perdomo, Lucia R (1975), Excavacaciones arqueológicas en zona Panche - Guaduas, Cundinamarca - Archaeological excavations in the Panche area - Guaduas, Cundinamarca (PDF) (in Spanish), ICANH, pp. 247–289, archived from the original (PDF) on 2016-06-11
- Rodríguez Freyle, Juan; Achury Valenzuela, Darío (1979) [1859 (1638)], El Carnero - Conquista i descubrimiento del nuevo reino de Granada de las Indias Occidentales del mar oceano, i fundacion de la ciudad de Santa Fe de Bogota (PDF) (in Spanish), Fundacion Biblioteca Ayacuch, pp. 1–598, archived from the original (PDF) on 2020-08-07
- Tovar Pinzón, Hermes (1995), "El saber indígena y la administración colonial española: la visita a la Provincia de Mariquita de 1559" (PDF), Anuario Colombiano de Historia Social y de la Cultura, 22: 9–33, archived from the original (PDF) on 2017-02-02
- "Epítome de la conquista del Nuevo Reino de Granada", Boletín Cultural y Bibliográfico, 16 (3), Banco de la República: 81–97, 1979 [1889 (1539)]
