= Juan de Céspedes Ruiz =

Spanish conquistador

Juan (Francisco) de Céspedes
- Born: 1501 or 1505; Argamasilla de Calatrava, Castile
- Died: late 1573 or 1576; Bogotá, New Kingdom of Granada
- Occupations: Conquistador
- Years active: 1521-1543
- Employer: Spanish Crown
- Known for: Foundation of Santa Marta; Conquest of the Tairona; Conquest of the Muisca; Conquest of the Panche; Conquest of the Sutagao; Mayor of Bogotá
- Spouse: Isabel Romero
- Partner: Isabel (indigenous)
- Children: unnamed indigenous (son); Antonio de Céspedes Romero (son); Lope Gutiérrez de Céspedes Romero (son)
- Parents: Lope de Céspedes (father); María (de) Ruiz (mother)
- Relatives: Diego de Céspedes Ruiz (brother); Hernando de Prado (half brother); María de Céspedes Romero (stepdaughter)

Encomendero of Bogotá
- In office 1542–1543
- Preceded by: Hernán Venegas Carrillo
- Succeeded by: Hernán Venegas Carrillo
- In office 1546–1546
- Preceded by: Gonzalo García Zorro
- Succeeded by: Juan Tafur

Juan (Francisco) de Céspedes Ruiz (1501 or 1505 in Argamasilla de Calatrava, Castile – 1573 or 1576 in Bogotá, New Kingdom of Granada) was a Spanish conquistador who is known as the founder of the town of Pasca, Cundinamarca, in the south of the Bogotá savanna, Colombia. De Céspedes arrived in the Americas in 1521 and participated in the conquest of the Tairona and the foundation of Santa Marta under Rodrigo de Bastidas. From 1542 to 1543 and in 1546 he served as mayor of Bogotá and after that until 1570 as lieutenant general of the first president of Colombia. Juan de Céspedes married Isabel Romero, one of the first Spanish women who arrived at Colombian territories and had two legitimate sons and one daughter. His date of death is uncertain; in late 1573 or 1576.

Knowledge about Juan de Céspedes has been provided by chroniclers Gonzalo Jiménez de Quesada in his memoirs (1576), Pedro Simón in 1626, Juan Rodríguez Freyle in his work El Carnero (written between 1636 and 1638) and Lucas Fernández de Piedrahita (1688).

== Biography ==
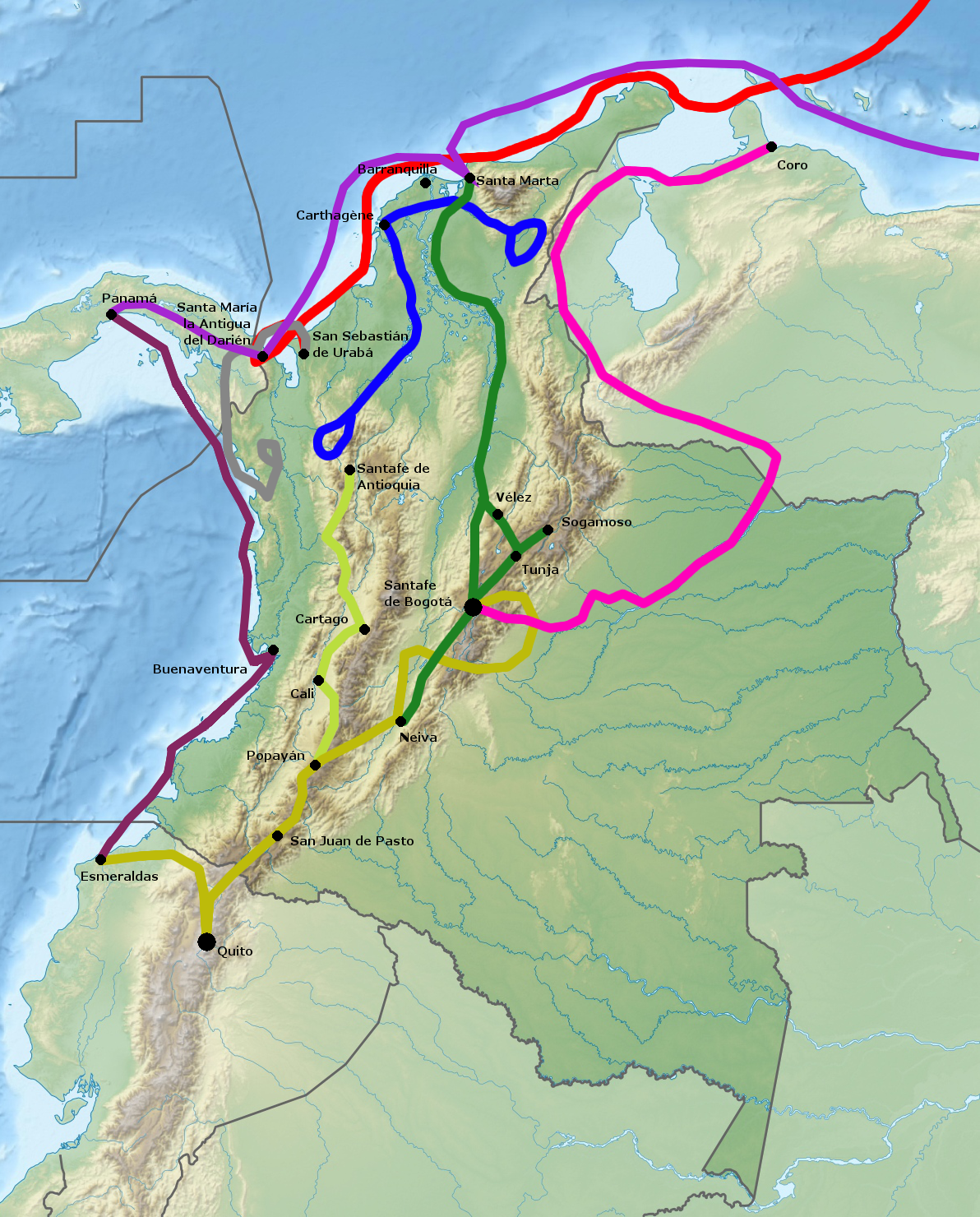
Juan de Céspedes formed part of the main expedition from the Caribbean coastal city of Santa Marta into the heart of the Colombian Andes, shown not entirely correctly in green

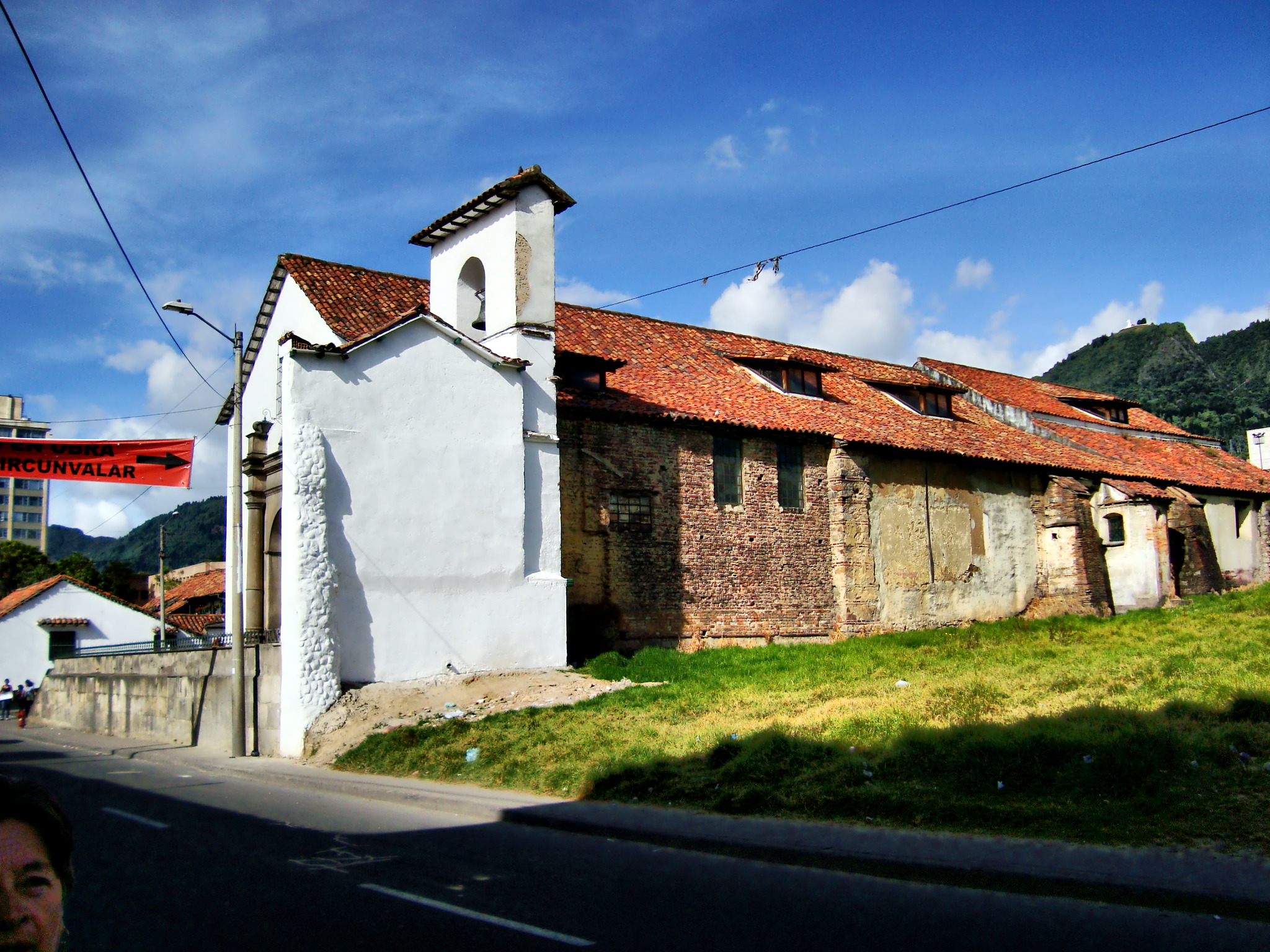
De Céspedes constructed the chapel of the Santa Bárbara church in Bogotá, on the site where he was almost killed by a lightning strike, honouring the patroness of thunder

Juan de Céspedes was born in 1501 or 1505 in Argamasilla de Calatrava, Castile-La Mancha in a family of hidalgos from Toledo. His parents were Lope de Céspedes and María (de) Ruiz and he had one brother; Diego. In 1521, he left Spain for Santo Domingo, Hispaniola, the first stronghold of the Spanish in the Americas. De Céspedes accompanied Rodrigo de Bastidas in the conquest of the Tairona and foundation of Santa Marta in 1525. After the Spanish king Carlos V installed García de Lerma as governor of Santa Marta on December 20, 1527, the latter named Juan de Céspedes Captain of the Infantry and sent him on an expedition into the Valle-Dupar, Pocigüeyca, a village south of Santa Marta towards Ciénaga, and the Magdalena River. After this expedition that took two years, De Céspedes was sent by Pedro Fernández de Lugo into the interior of the province of Santa Marta.

When in 1536 Gonzalo Jiménez de Quesada organised the main expedition into the Colombian Andes, he named De Céspedes as one of eight captains; of cavalry. At this expedition also his brother Hernando de Prado joined. In the lower parts of the Magdalena River, at the confluence with the San Jorge and Cauca Rivers, Juan de Céspedes and Juan de Sanct Martín reached first and were joined by the other troops of De Quesada. After the journey of a year into the Muisca Confederation, the troops settled on the Bogotá savanna. De Céspedes was sent south, while the other troops went north, into the territories of the zaque of Hunza. De Céspedes reached Fusagasugá in May 1537 with forty infantry and 15 horses. On July 15, 1537, Juan de Céspedes conquered and founded Pasca, Cundinamarca. De Céspedes continued south and west from there through the Sumapaz Páramo into the territories of the Sutagao. He was accompanied by Juan López de Herrera and suffered from the cold climate. As a result of his bravery during this harsh conquest, De Céspedes was awarded the encomiendas of Ubaque, Chipaque, Quetame and Subachoque, to the east of and on the Altiplano Cundiboyacense. The encomiendas of Ubaque and Quetame were passed on to his son Lope de Céspedes.

=== New Kingdom of Granada ===
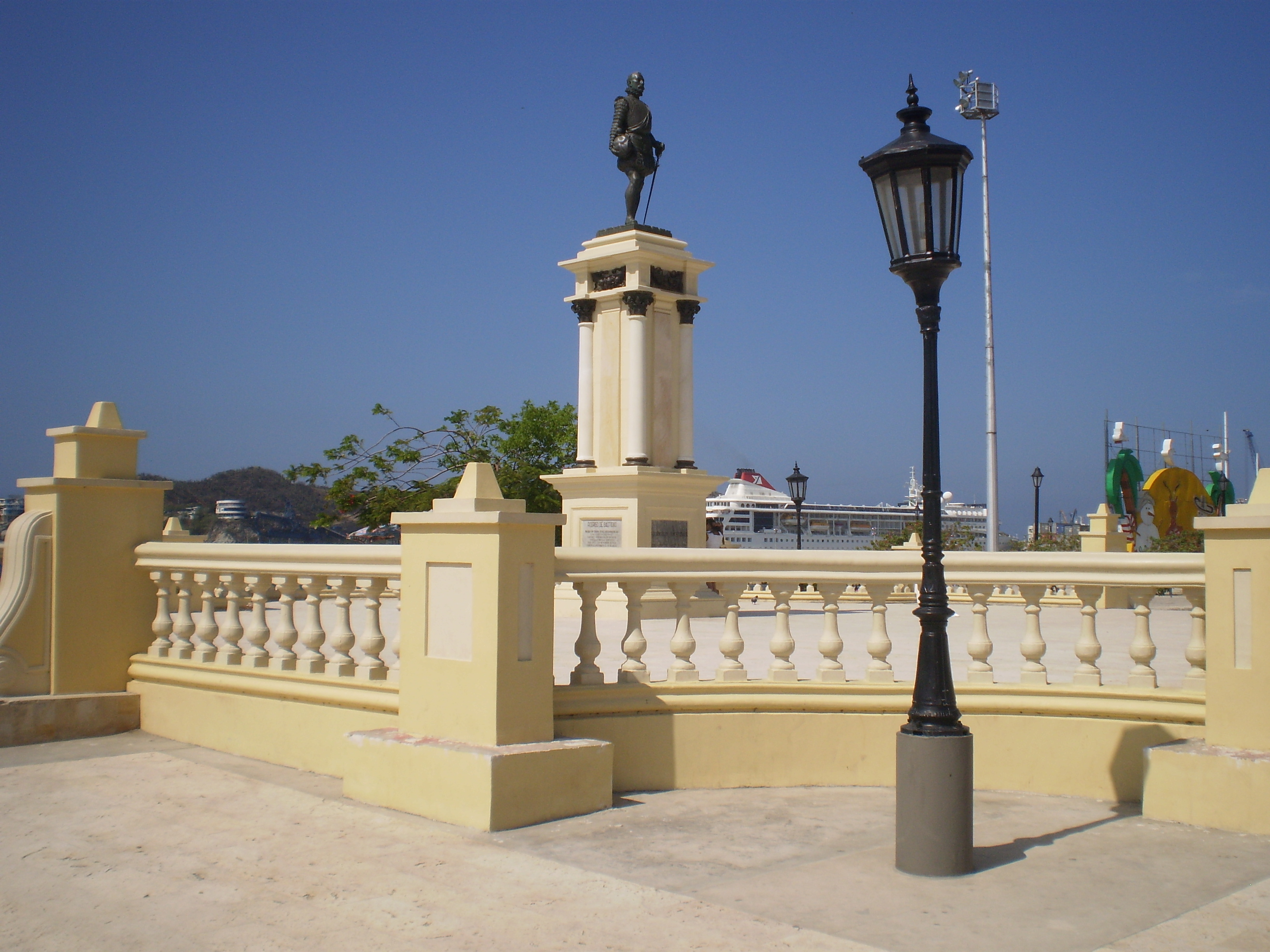
At age 20 or 24, Juan de Céspedes took part in the foundation of Santa Marta under Rodrigo de Bastidas

Pasca, Cundinamarca, was founded on July 15, 1537, by Juan de Céspedes

In 1539, Hernán Pérez de Quesada, the brother of the founder of Bogotá, Gonzalo Jiménez de Quesada, had taken the governance of the New Kingdom of Granada. In this year, the conquistadors, among which De Céspedes, asked the King of Spain to construct a hospital in Bogotá. Under the command of Pérez de Quesada, De Céspedes and Juan de Sanct Martín tortured the last zipa of the Muisca, Sagipa, by cutting and burning the soles of the feet of the Muisca ruler. De Céspedes was sent westward into the terrain of the Panche, who were beaten in the Battle of Tocarema in August 1538. De Céspedes passed through San Antonio del Tequendama. From 1542 to 1543, De Céspedes was mayor of Bogotá, the capital of New Kingdom of Granada. He succeeded Hernán Venegas Carrillo, who occupied this position after De Céspedes again.

In 1543, Alonso Luis de Lugo sent De Céspedes back to Santa Marta to help rebuild the city that was destroyed and burned by the French pirate Roberto Baal. From Santa Marta, De Céspedes participated in conquests in the interior. In 1546, De Céspedes returned to the capital in the Andes and served a second term as mayor of the city. The first president of the New Kingdom of Granada, Andrés Díaz Venero de Leyva, named Juan de Céspedes his lieutenant general, a position he held until it was abolished in 1570. In 1565, De Céspedes constructed the Santa Bárbara church in Bogotá, that still exists today. He constructed the chapel thanking the Saint of Thunder, as he escaped death of a lightning strike at that place. The lightning strike did kill one of his slaves.

Juan de Céspedes had one son with an indigenous woman named Isabel. De Céspedes married Isabel Romero, one of the first Spanish women who arrived at the Spanish colony in northern South America, the widow of soldier Juan Francisco Lorenzo, who drowned in the Opón River. The marriage of De Céspedes and Romero was the first wedding in the New Kingdom of Granada, together with Lope Rioja and Elvira Gutiérrez. The couple had two sons, Antonio and Lope, and De Céspedes one stepdaughter; María, daughter of Isabel Romero and her first husband who was given the last name of Juan. Lope (Gutiérrez) de Céspedes served as mayor of Bogotá from 1577 to 1578 and in 1605 and Antonio held the same position from 1591 to 1592 and 1596 to 1597.

Juan de Céspedes died in late 1573 or 1576 in the New Kingdom of Granada. The house of De Céspedes was discovered on the site of the first convent of San Águstin, when it was moved to the San Francisco church, the oldest remaining church in Bogotá.

== Conquest by Juan de Céspedes ==
| Name bold is founded | Department | Date | Year | Notes | Map |
|---|---|---|---|---|---|
| Santa Marta; Taganga with Rodrigo de Bastidas | Magdalena | 29 July | 1525 | | |
| Valledupar | Cesar | | 1527–29 | | |
| Fusagasugá | Cundinamarca | May | 1537 | | |
| Pasca | Cundinamarca | 15 July | 1537 | | |
| Tibacuy | Cundinamarca | | 1537 | | |
| San Antonio del Tequendama | Cundinamarca | | 1539 | | |

== Encomiendas ==
Encomiendas of Juan de Céspedes on and around the Bogotá savanna

== See also ==
- List of conquistadors in Colombia
- Spanish conquest of the Muisca
- Hernán Pérez de Quesada, Battle of Tocarema
- Panche, Gonzalo Jiménez de Quesada

== Bibliography ==
- Fernández de Piedrahita, Lucas (1688), "VI", Historia general de las conquistas del Nuevo Reino de Granada (in Spanish), archived from the original on 2016-11-13
- Jiménez de Quesada, Gonzalo (1576), Memoria de los descubridores, que entraron conmigo a descubrir y conquistar el Reino de Granada (in Spanish)
- Rodríguez Freyle, Juan; Achury Valenzuela, Darío (1979) [1859 (1638)], El Carnero - Conquista i descubrimiento del nuevo reino de Granada de las Indias Occidentales del mar oceano, i fundacion de la ciudad de Santa Fe de Bogota (in Spanish), Fundacion Biblioteca Ayacuch, pp. 1–592, ISBN 978-84-660-0025-3
- Simón, Pedro (1892) [1626], Noticias historiales de las conquistas de Tierra Firme en las Indias occidentales (1882-92) vol.1-5 (in Spanish)
