= Juan de Sanct Martín =

Spanish conquistador

- Other name: Juan de San Martín
- Occupations: Conquistador
- Years active: 1536->1550
- Employer: Spanish Crown
- Known for: Spanish conquest of the Muisca; Founder of Cuítiva; Founder of Pesca; Quest for El Dorado

Juan de Sanct Martín, also known as Juan de San Martín, was a Spanish conquistador. Little is known about De Sanct Martín, apart from a passage in El Carnero (1638) by Juan Rodríguez Freyle and Epítome de la conquista del Nuevo Reino de Granada, a work of uncertain authorship. He took part in the expedition from Santa Marta into the Eastern Ranges of the Colombian Andes led by Gonzalo Jiménez de Quesada and founded Cuítiva, Boyacá in 1550. Juan de Sanct Martín headed the left flank of the Spanish troops in the Battle of Tocarema against the Panche on August 20, 1538, while his fellow conquistador Juan de Céspedes commanded the right flank. In this battle, Juan de Sanct Martín killed the cacique of the Panche and was hurt himself. Juan de Sanct Martín had confronted the Panche the year before, when he was sent to the west while De Céspedes went south. Due to the resistance of the bellicose Panche, De Sanct Martín returned to the Spanish camp.

== Conquest by Juan de Sanct Martín ==
Name bold is founded	Department	Date	Year	Notes	Map
El Colegio	Cundinamarca		1537		
Pesca	Boyacá	20 December	1548		
Cuítiva	Boyacá	19 January	1550		

== See also ==
- List of conquistadors in Colombia
- Spanish conquest of the Muisca
- El Dorado
- Hernán Pérez de Quesada
- Gonzalo Jiménez de Quesada

== Bibliography ==
- Blanco Barros, José Agustín, Historia de Bogotá (PDF), Sociedad Geográfica de Colombia, pp. 1–18
- Rodríguez Freyle, Juan; Achury Valenzuela, Darío (1979) [1859 (1638)], El Carnero - Conquista i descubrimiento del nuevo reino de Granada de las Indias Occidentales del mar oceano, i fundacion de la ciudad de Santa Fe de Bogota (PDF) (in Spanish), Fundacion Biblioteca Ayacuch, pp. 1–598
- Epítome de la conquista del Nuevo Reino de Granada, Banco de la República, 1979 [1889 (1539)], pp. 81–97
