= Magdalena de Guatavita =

Muisca noblewoman (16th century)

Magdalena de Guatavita (16th century) was a Muisca noblewoman, daughter of Sagipa, the last ruler (psihipqua) of Muyquytá, currently known as Bogotá. Her marriage to the Spanish conquistador Hernán Venegas Carrillo represents one of the first unions between the indigenous nobility and the Spanish conquering elite in the New Kingdom of Granada, present-day Colombia.

== Life ==
She belonged to the ruling family of the Muisca, one of the most advanced civilizations in the northern Andes. Her father, Sagipa, was the last recognized zipa before the consolidation of Spanish rule and the beginning of the colony and subsequent kingdom and viceroyalty of New Granada. She was the sister of the cacique of Guatavita. After the arrival of the conquistadors, she married the conquistador Hernán Venegas Carrillos y Manosalva, with whom she had several children and a distinguished family of descendants that still exist. This union is considered one of the first between indigenous and Spanish nobility in the New Kingdom of Granada. Venegas Carrillo actively participated in the conquest of the Muisca and Panche peoples, received several encomiendas, and held important positions, including that of mayor of Santafé de Santafé before the Royal Audience on seven occasions.

== Descendants ==
Magdalena had several children, including:

- Alonso Venegas Guatavita: Known for having killed the conquistador Gonzalo García Zorro in a duel in Santafé de Bogotá in 1566. This act was interpreted as revenge for García Zorro's participation in the capture and death of his grandfather, the Zipa Sagipa.
- María, Isabel, and Fernán Venegas: Other children who, along with Alonso, made up the Venegas Guatavita family, one of the first founding and prominent families in the colonial society of the New Kingdom of Granada, also mixed with noble Muisca and Spanish blood.
