= Hernán Venegas Carrillo =

Spanish Conquistador of Colombia

- Born: c.1513 Córdoba, Castile
- Died: February 2, 1583; Bogotá, New Kingdom of Granada
- Burial place: Cathedral of Bogotá; 4°35′52.64″N 74°04′30.86″W
- Occupations: Conquistador
- Employer: Spanish Crown
- Known for: Conquest of the Muisca; Conquest of the Panche; Foundation of Bituima; Foundation of Apulo; Foundation of Tocaima; Mayor of Bogotá
- Spouses: Magdalena de Guatavita; Juana Ponce de León y Figueroa
- Children: María, Alonso, Isabel, Fernán Venegas; Maria Venegas Carrillo Ponce de León; Alonso, Pedro, Luis, Francisco, Juana, Isabel, Inés Venegas Ponce de León
- Parents: Diego Ruiz Venegas Manosalvas (father); Inés Venegas (mother)
- Family: Pedro Fernández de Valenzuela (cousin)

Encomendero of Bogotá
- In office 1542–1542
- Preceded by: Juan Díaz Hidalgo
- Succeeded by: Juan de Céspedes
- In office 1543–1544
- Preceded by: Juan de Céspedes
- Succeeded by: Juan Ruiz de Orejuela

Hernán Venegas Carrillo Manosalvas (c.1513 – 2 February 1583) was a Spanish conquistador for who participated in the Spanish conquest of the Muisca and Panche people in the New Kingdom of Granada, present-day Colombia. Venegas Carrillo was mayor of Santa Fe de Bogotá for two terms; in 1542 and from 1543 to 1544.

== Personal life ==
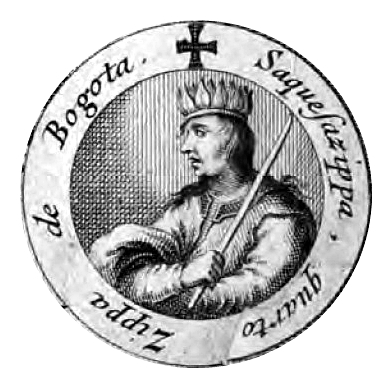
Sagipa was Hernán's first father-in-law

Venegas Carrillo was born in Córdoba, Andalusia, around 1513. His parents were Diego Ruiz Venegas Manosalvas and Inés Venegas. Venegas Carrillo was married twice, first to Magdalena de Guatavita, the sister of Sagipa (also named Zaquezazipa), the last Muisca zipa. This was one of the first mestizo marriages conducted in the New Kingdom of Granada. With her Venegas Carrillo had four children: María, Alonso, Isabel and Fernán Venegas. After the death of his Muisca wife, Venegas Carrillo married Juana Ponce de León and had eight more children with her: Maria, Alonso, Pedro, Luis, Francisco, Juana, Isabel and Inés Venegas Ponce de León. His daughter Maria Venegas Carrillo Ponce de León died in Pamplona, Norte de Santander. Alonso, his son with Magdalena de Guatavita, killed fellow conquistador Gonzalo García Zorro in a duel in 1566. Conquistador Pedro Fernández de Valenzuela was his cousin.

== Biography ==
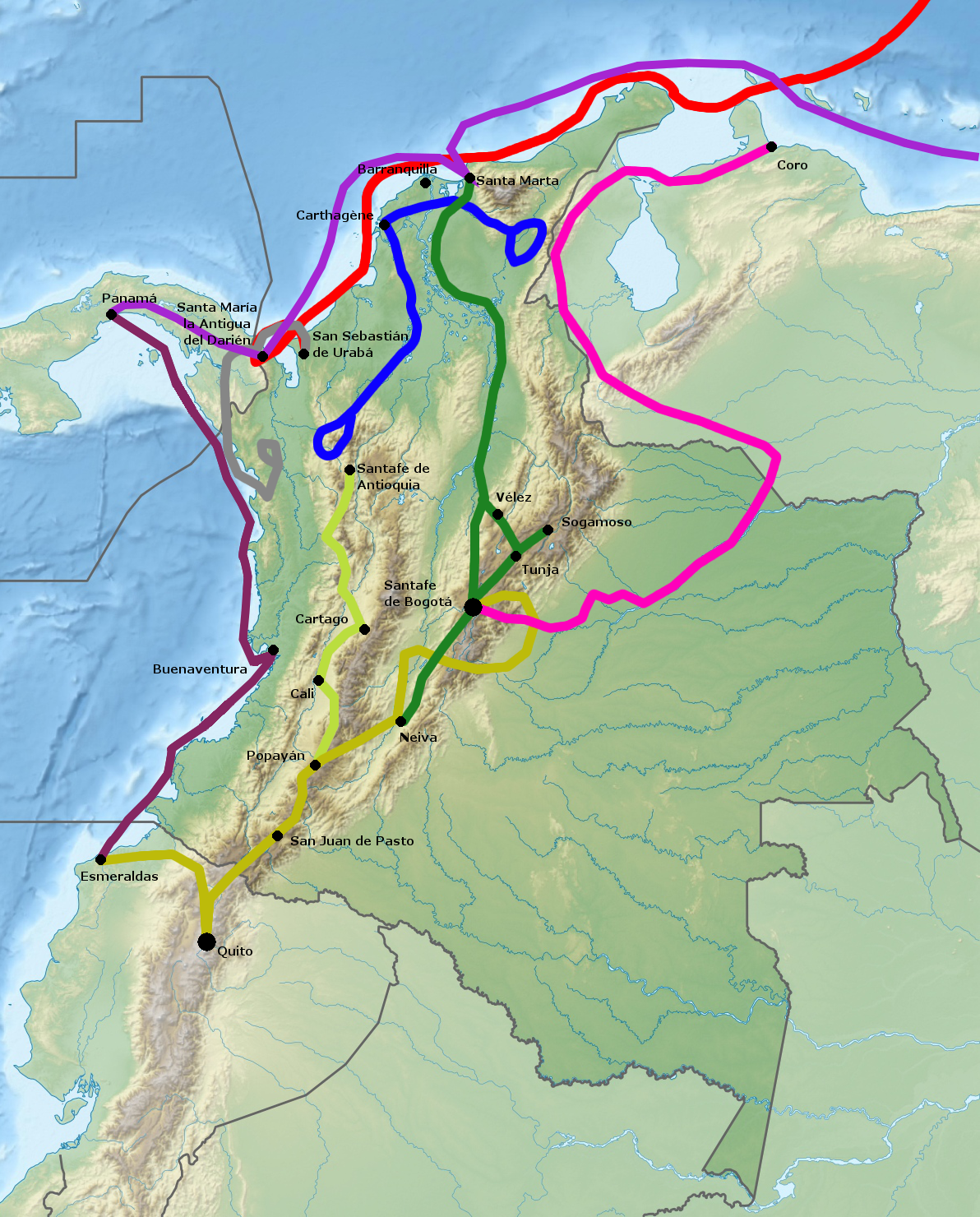
Hernán Venegas Carrillo was a member of the main expedition from the Caribbean coastal city of Santa Marta into the heart of the Colombian Andes, shown in green

Hernán Venegas Carrillo embarked on a ship sailing from Seville, Spain to the New World, probably in 1533, in the company of Juan del Junco. He was one of the conquistadors who participated in the expedition from Santa Marta on the Caribbean coast to the Muisca Confederation on the Altiplano Cundiboyacense.

In 1541, Venegas Carrillo received ownership of the encomiendas of Guatavita, Gachetá, Chipaleque, Pausa, Tuala, Tuaquira, Suba, Tocancipá, Gachancipá, Gachacá, Unta, Turmequé and Itencipá. In 1542 and from 1543 to 1544, Hernán Venegas Carrillo was mayor, at that time called encomendero, of Bogotá. Between the two terms, the post was filled by Juan de Céspedes.

On March 20, 1544, Venegas Carrillo founded the town of Tocaima. He had been sent east by Alonso Luis de Lugo. Tocaima became one of the richest cities in the New Kingdom of Granada.

In 1547, Venegas Carrillo was sent to Spain and returned the next year. He made several further voyages back to Europe and during one of them he married Juana Ponce de León y Figueroa, daughter of the governor of Venezuela Pedro Ponce de León y Riquelme. His wife accompanied Venegas Carrillo to Bogotá in 1569.

Hernán Venegas Carrillo died on February 2, 1583, in Bogotá and is buried in the Primatial Cathedral of Bogotá, located at the Plaza de Bolívar square in the centre of the Colombian capital. Various of his many children became the encomenderos of Guatavita, Gachetá, Chipasaque (today Junín), Tausa, Suba and Gachancipá.

Encomiendas of Venegas Carrillo on and around the Bogotá savanna

== Conquests of Hernán Venegas Carrillo ==
| Name bold is founded | Department | Date | Year | Notes | Map |
|---|---|---|---|---|---|
| Bituima | Cundinamarca | 15 August | 1543 | | |
| Chaguaní | Cundinamarca | | 1543 | | |
| Apulo | Cundinamarca | 5 January | 1544 | | |
| Tocaima | Cundinamarca | 20 March | 1544 | | |

== Honours ==
A school founded in 1958 in Tocaima is named after Hernán Venegas Carrillo.

== See also ==
- List of conquistadors in Colombia
- Spanish conquest of the Muisca
- Hernán Pérez de Quesada, Battle of Tocarema
- Panche, Gonzalo Jiménez de Quesada
