= Gonzalo García Zorro =

Spanish conquistador

- Born: c. 1500; Guadalcanal, Extremadura, Spain
- Died: 1566 (aged 65–66); Santa Fe de Bogotá, New Kingdom of Granada
- Cause of death: Duel with Alonso Venegas Carrillo
- Occupations: Conquistador
- Years active: 1536–1544
- Employer: Spanish Crown
- Known for: Spanish conquest of the Muisca
- Spouse(s): Luisa (indigenous); Margarita (indigenous from Tunja); Francisca Pimentel Treceno
- Children: 3

Encomendero of Bogotá
- In office 1544–1545
- Preceded by: Juan Ruiz de Orejuela
- Succeeded by: Juan Ruiz de Orejuela
- In office 1545–1546
- Preceded by: Juan Ruiz de Orejuela
- Succeeded by: Juan de Céspedes
- In office 1548–1548
- Preceded by: Juan Muñoz de Collantes
- Succeeded by: Juan Ruiz de Orejuela
- In office 1550–1551
- Preceded by: Juan de Avellaneda
- Succeeded by: Juan de Avellaneda
- In office 1553–1554
- Preceded by: Juan de Rivera
- Succeeded by: Juan Tafur
- In office 1556–1556
- Preceded by: Antonio Ruiz
- Succeeded by: Domingo Lozano
- In office 1564–1564
- Preceded by: Juan Ruiz de Orejuela
- Succeeded by: Andrés de Molina

Gonzalo García Zorro (c. 1500 – 1566) was a Spanish conquistador who participated in the Spanish conquest of the Muisca people. García Zorro was encomendero (mayor) of Santa Fe de Bogotá for seven terms, and received the encomiendas of Fusagasugá and Fosca.

He married three times, twice with Muisca women, and had one daughter, Francisca, and a son, Diego. García Zorro died of wounds he suffered in a duel with Alonso Venegas. Venegas was the son of fellow conquistador Hernán Venegas Carrillo and the grandson through his mother of Sagipa, the last zipa (leader) of the Muisca, whom García Zorro had helped to kill.

Knowledge of the life of García Zorro comes from the works Elegías de varones ilustres de Indias (1589) and El Carnero (1638), by Juan de Castellanos and Juan Rodríguez Freyle respectively.

== Biography ==
Gonzalo García Zorro was born around 1500 in Guadalcanal, at the border between Extremadura and Seville.

García Zorro joined the expedition led by Gonzalo Jiménez de Quesada from Santa Marta towards the Muisca Confederation in April 1536 as a cavalry leader. García Zorro was later convicted of crimes against the last zipa, Sagipa.

Gonzalo García Zorro was seven times encomendero of Santa Fe de Bogotá: in 1544 succeeding Juan Ruiz de Orejuela, who succeeded García Zorro again; from 1545 to 1546, succeeding the second term of Juan Ruiz de Orejuela and preceding Juan de Céspedes; in 1548 between the reign of Juan Muñoz de Collantes and the third term by Juan Ruiz de Orejuela; from 1550 to 1551 in between the terms of Juan de Avellaneda; between 1553 and 1554 succeeding Juan de Rivera and preceding Juan Tafur; in 1556 between the terms of Antonio Ruiz and Domingo Lozano; and finally in 1564 succeeding Juan Ruiz de Orejuela again and preceding Andrés de Molina.

Gonzalo García Zorro received the encomiendas of Fusagasugá, and Fosca. The encomienda of Suesca was shared between Gonzalo García Zorro and Juan Tafur.

Gonzalo García Zorro died in 1566 at Santa Fe de Bogotá of wounds he received in a duel with Alonso Venegas. Venagas was the son of Magdalena de Guatavita, daughter of Sagipa, and Hernán Venegas Carrillo.

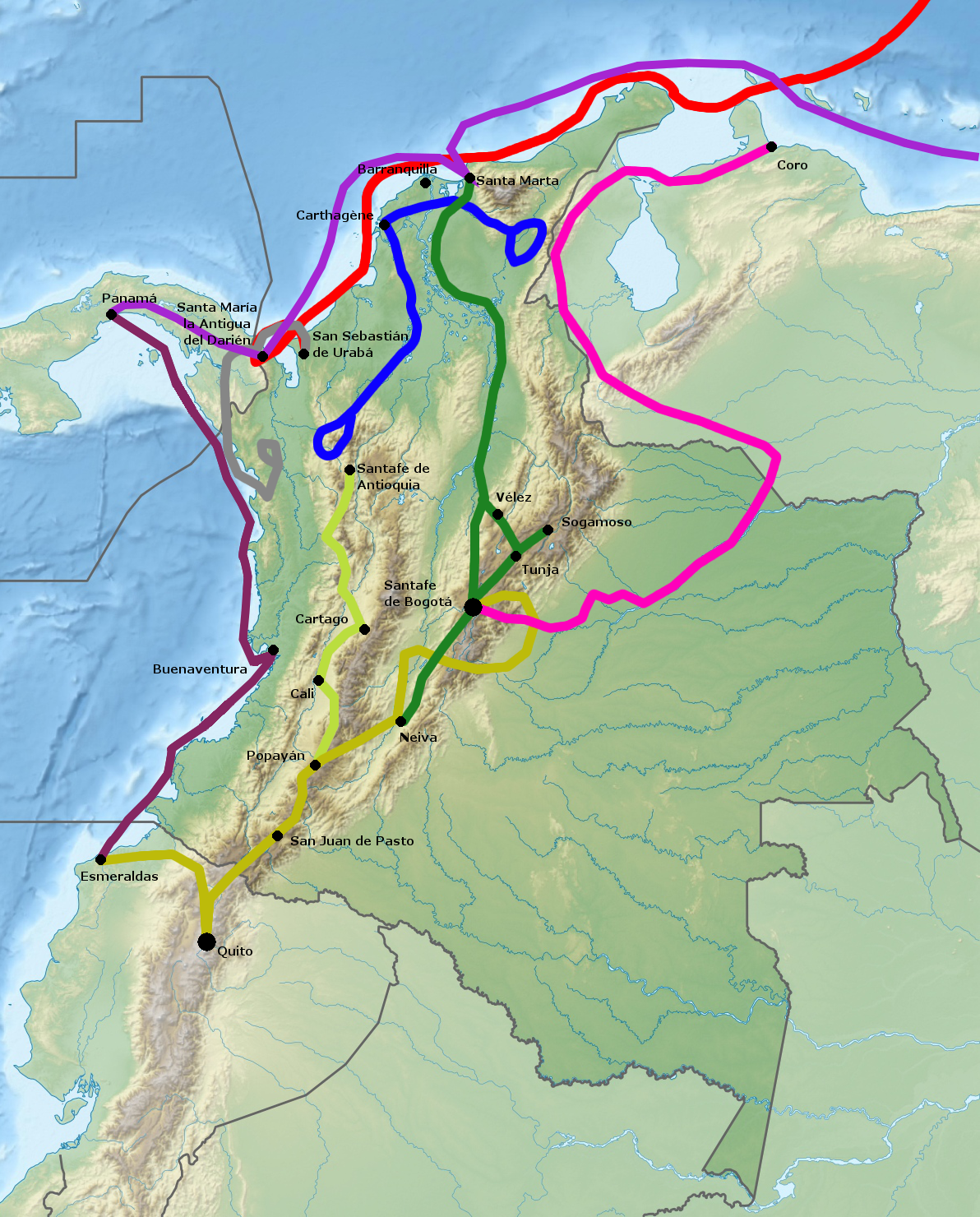
Gonzalo García Zorro was one of the soldiers in the expedition along the green route from Santa Marta into the Muisca Confederation

== See also ==
- List of conquistadors in Colombia
- Spanish conquest of the Muisca
- Hernán Pérez de Quesada, Hernán Venegas Carrillo
- Gonzalo Jiménez de Quesada

== Bibliography ==
- Acosta, Joaquín (1848), Compendio histórico del descubrimiento y colonización de la Nueva Granada en el siglo décimo sexto – Historical overview of discovery and colonization of New Granada in the sixteenth century (PDF), Paris: Beau Press, pp. 1–460, OCLC 23030434, archived from the original (PDF) on 2012-08-18
- De Castellanos, Juan (1857) [1589], Elegías de varones ilustres de Indias (in Spanish), Pontificia Universidad Javeriana, pp. 1–567, ISBN 978-958-683-677-7
- Fernández de Piedrahita, Lucas (1676), "VI", Historia general de las conquistas del Nuevo Reino de Granada (PDF) (in Spanish), archived from the original (PDF) on 2014-06-11
- Ocampo López, Javier (1996), Leyendas populares colombianas – Popular Colombian legends (in Spanish), Plaza y Janes Editores, pp. 1–384, ISBN 9789581402670
- De Plaza, José Antonio (1810), Memorias para la historia de la Nueva Granada desde su descubrimiento el 20 de julio de 1810, Imprenta del Neo-Granadino, pp. 1–464
- Rodríguez Freyle, Juan; Achury Valenzuela, Darío (1979) [1859 (1638)], El Carnero – Conquista i descubrimiento del nuevo reino de Granada de las Indias Occidentales del mar oceano, i fundacion de la ciudad de Santa Fe de Bogota (in Spanish), Fundacion Biblioteca Ayacuch, pp. 1–592, ISBN 978-84-660-0025-3
