= Jerónima Nava y Saavedra =

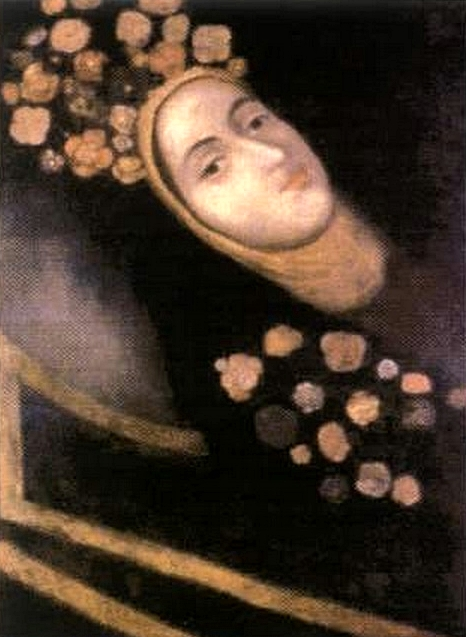
Jerónima Nava y Saavedra

Jerónima Nava y Saavedra (25 April 1669 – 31 May 1727) was a writer and Catholic religious from New Kingdom of Granada (present-day Colombia).

== Biography ==
She was born in the town of Tocaima, Bogotá Province, New Kingdom of Granada, 25 April 1669. After Nava's mother died when she was five years old, Nava moved to Santa Fe de Bogotá, where she later entered the Santa Clara Convent. She became a religious and spent the rest of her life in various positions such as caretaker, nurse, secretary and choir vicar.

Her confessor, the priest Juan de Olmos y Zapiaín, described her physically and intellectually as "a tall woman, with a lively and beautiful face and eyes and a sensitive intelligence and manly understanding."

The only known work by Nava is Autobiografía de una Monja Venerable, (Autobiography of a Venerable Nun), a set of 64 mystical visions written in the most mature period of her life thanks to the approval given by her confessor, Juan de Olmos y Zapiaín, who gave his support to continue this work. In the book, she put into verse her raptures, mystical anguish, and the tribulations that she suffered with her health.

She died in Santa Fe de Bogotá on 31 May 1727.

== Works ==
- Autobiografía de una Monja Venerable
