= Tocaima =

- City and Municipality
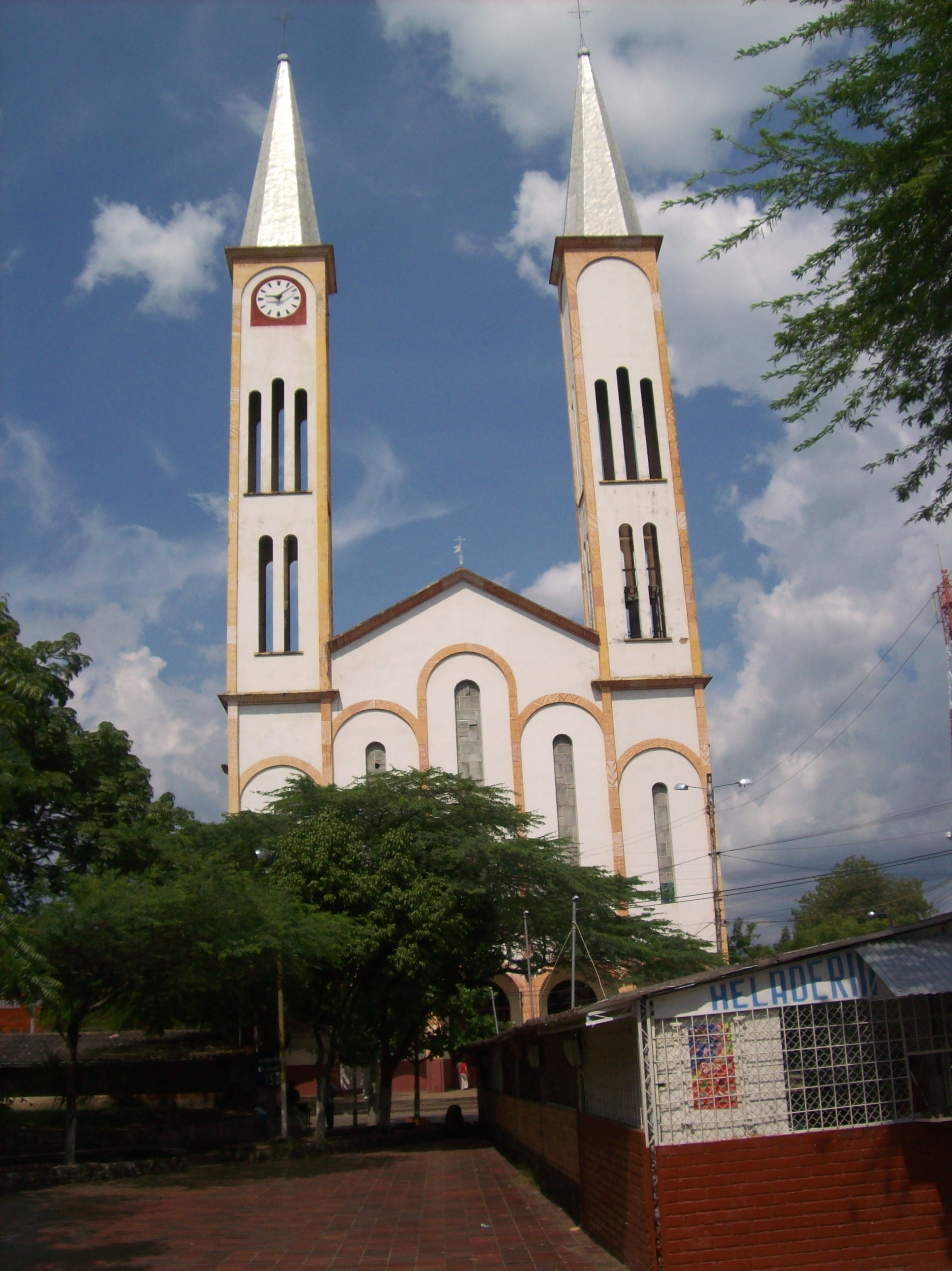

- Flag Coat of arms

- Location of the town and municipality of Tocaima within Cundinamarca Department

- Location in Colombia
- Coordinates: 4°30′N 74°40′W
- Country: Colombia
- Department: Cundinamarca
- Founded: March 20, 1544
- Destroyed: 1581
- Re-founded: March 18, 1621
- Founder: Hernán Venegas Carrillo
- Named for: Legendary warrior of the Guacana tribe
- Municipal Seat: Tocaima
- Elevation: 432 m (1,416 ft)

Population (Census 2018)
  - Tocaima (Municipality): 13,649
- Time zone: UTC-05:00 (Western Caribbean)
- Area code: 83
- Website: tocaima-cundinamarca.gov.co

Tocaima (Spanish pronunciation: [toˈkajma]) refers to both a city and a municipality in Cundinamarca, Colombia.

== City ==
The city of Tocaima was founded on March 20, 1544 as San Dionisio de los Caballeros de Tocaima by the Spanish explorer Hernán Venegas Carrillo. This city is most well known for being a vacation site during religious holidays, especially for college students from Bogotá and other surrounding areas.

The town is crossed by the Pati River, which sometimes floods the town.

=== History ===
Before Spanish colonization, the area was home to the Guacana, an Amerindian tribe belonging to the Panche Amerindian Nation. Tocaima was named in honor of a legendary warrior from this tribe, during the ruling period of the Cacica Guacana.

It is believed that Tocaima is the only city in the Cundinamarca Department that presently has a royal title and coat of arms issued by the Spanish Monarchy. Charles V issued the royal title and coat of arms on February 7, 1549, in appreciation of the city's loyalty and fame for being a powerful and wealthy region.

In 1581, the city was completely destroyed by a devastating flood of the Pati River. President Juan de Borja sent Captain Martin de Ocampo to refound the city, which he did on March 18, 1621 by constructing the Convent of San Jacinto and its contiguous chapel.

During the decolonization of Colombia from Spain in 1810, Tocaima was represented in the electoral and constitutional college by jurist Miguel de Tobar y Zerrato and Don Juan Salvador Rodriguez de Lago. The Cabildo, or colonial administrative council, was re-established that same year.

The new Constitution of Cundinamarca, created in 1815, divided the nation into cantons, which provoked a confrontation between the Tocaima Canton and the neighboring Canton of La Mesa. In 1816, Spain re-conquered the colonies and subsequently repressed the newly created government.

After defeating the Spanish in 1819, the colonists declared total independence from Spain and created the Republic of Gran Colombia, which—led by General Santander in 1822—re-established the Tocaima Canton.

In 1906, Tocaima was notable for its gold and copper mines, but neither mineral was mined there by 1920.

== Notable people ==
- Jerónima Nava y Saavedra (1669–1727), writer and Catholic religious
