= J. Michael Francis =

Canadian historian (born 1968)

John Michael Francis (born 1968) is a Canadian historian.

Francis was born in 1968 and raised in Alberta.

He earned a Bachelor of Arts in history, with honors, as well as a Master of Arts in the same subject, from the University of Alberta. He then completed a PhD at the University of Cambridge in 1998. Francis taught at the University of North Florida from 1997 to 2012, when he joined the St. Petersburg campus of the University of South Florida as Hough Family Chair of Florida Studies. Between 2016 and 2020, Francis also served as chair of the USF Department of History and Politics. In 2018 Governor Rick Scott appointed Francis to the Florida Historical Commission. He served for 8 years until Governor Ron DeSantis replaced him on October 30, 2026. In October 2021, Francis was awarded the Officer’s Cross of the Order of Isabella the Catholic by Felipe VI of Spain.

Francis founded a digital archive, La Florida, in 2018. The archive won the Florida Trust for Historic Preservation's 2024 Florida Preservation Award for communications and media.

== Selected books ==
- Francis, J. Michael (2015). St. Augustine America's First City: A Story of Unbroken History & Enduring Spirit. Editions du Signe. ISBN 9782746832206.
- Francis, J. Michael; Kole, Kathleen M. (2011). Murder and Martyrdom in Spanish Florida: Don Juan and the Guale Uprising of 1597. North American Archaeology Fund. ISBN 9781939302205.
- Francis, J. Michael (2007). Invading Colombia: Spanish Accounts of the Gonzalo Jiménez de Quesada Expedition of Conquest. Pennsylvania State University Press. doi:10.5325/j.ctt7v626. ISBN 9780271029368.
- Francis, J. Michael (2005). Iberia and the Americas: Culture, Politics, and History. ABC-CLIO. ISBN 9781851094219.
