= Pedro Fernández de Lugo =

Spanish explorer

Pedro Fernández de Lugo (Seville, 1475 – Santa Marta, Colombia, 13 October 1536) was the second adelantado of the Canary Islands, governor of Tenerife and La Palma, and governor of Santa Marta in Colombia.

== Biography ==
=== Canary Islands ===
Pedro Fernández de Lugo was the son of Alonso Fernández de Lugo and Beatriz de Fonseca. Born in Seville, Pedro arrived at Gran Canaria as a young child and later accompanied his father to expeditions to Barbary. In 1509, his father gave him some of the rights and powers over the coast of Africa that he had acquired in 1499. Pedro commanded the tower of Santa Cruz de la Mar Pequeña in Morocco and participated in expeditions against the Berbers alongside the Portuguese.

At the request of his father, he became the second adelantado of the Canary Islands and governor of Tenerife and La Palma, a title confirmed again by Charles I of Spain, in Barcelona, on 17 August 1519.

His rule of Tenerife and La Palma was very unpopular and generated many complaints from the residents, so in 1526 the Emperor issued a royal decree guaranteeing their rights. A scandalous event was the execution of Pedro Hernández de Alfaro in La Orotava. His widow appealed to the Court, and in 1529 Fernández de Lugo was replaced by another governor and subjected to a formal inquiry into his conduct in office, but he managed to regain his position the following year.

Further arbitrary actions and the persistent complaints from Alfaro's widow led to another inquiry into his conduct in office and his suspension as governor of Tenerife and Palma in 1536, although he retained his title of Adelantado, which was hereditary.

=== Expedition to South America ===
But since 1530, news from the American discoveries, spread by the men of the expeditions of Sebastián Gaboto and Diego García de Moguer, had impressed him deeply and he tried to obtain the permission to conquer the Río de la Plata in late 1530 or early 1531, but on the condition that the Crown gave the government of Tenerife and La Palma to his son Alonso, which was refused.

Three years later, Pedro de Mendoza conquered the Río de la Plata and founded Buenos Aires. This left Fernández de Lugo frustrated, until he received news from a soldier of the conquistador Rodrigo de Bastidas, who was then in Tenerife, about the riches expected to be found up the Magdalena River. Pedro Fernández de Lugo requested the governorship of Santa Marta in the second half of 1534 and finally agreed to withdraw the request for his son Alonso to be appointed Adelantado in the Canary Islands. The Crown granted his request, and the agreement was signed on 22 January 1535.

At the age of sixty, he organized the expedition to the New World, backed financially by Cristóbal Francesquini and Juan Alberto Gerardini, a Florentine residing in Tenerife from 1510. Pedro departed from the port of Santa Cruz de Tenerife in November 1535, arriving in Santa Marta in early January of the following year. Among the 1,200 men he led were his own son, Alonso Luis de Lugo, as captain, as well as other relatives and prominent figures from the island of Tenerife.

In Santa Marta, Fernández de Lugo appointed Gonzalo Jiménez de Quesada as General Lieutenant of the expedition whose purpose was to find the source of the Magdalena River and a land path to Peru. The expedition ended up discovering and conquering the Muisca. Fernández de Lugo died in November 1536, before receiving news of the newly discovered Muisca.
