= Sagipa =

Ruler in pre-Spanish Colombia

- zipa
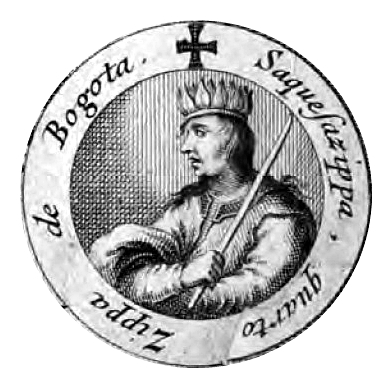
- Sagipa, the last independent psihipqua of Muyquytá depicted in 1688
- Reign: 1537–1539
- Predecessor: Tisquesusa
- Successor: Position abolished; Gonzalo Jiménez de Quesada as first encomendero of Bogotá
- Born: unknown Muisca Confederation
- Died: 1539; Bosa; New Kingdom of Granada
- Issue: Magdalena de Guatavita
- Chibcha: Zaquesazipa
- Dynasty: Muyquytá

Sagipa or Zaquesazipa (died 1539, Bosa, New Kingdom of Granada) was the fifth and last ruler (psihipqua) of Muyquytá, currently known as Bogotá, as of 1537. He was the brother of his predecessor Bogotá but the traditional faction of the Muisca considered him an usurper as his nephew Chiayzaque, the cacique of Chía, was the legitimate successor of Tisquesusa. His hoa counterpart in the northern part of the Muisca territory was Quiminza, the last surviving ruler of the Muisca. The daughter of Sagipa, named as Magdalena de Guatavita, married conquistador Hernán Venegas Carrillo, one of the first mestizo marriages in the New Kingdom of Granada.

Sagipa appears with alternative names in the Spanish chronicles; Saquesazippa, Saquezazippa, Sacresasigua, Saxagipa, Sajipa and Zaquezazigua.

== Biography ==
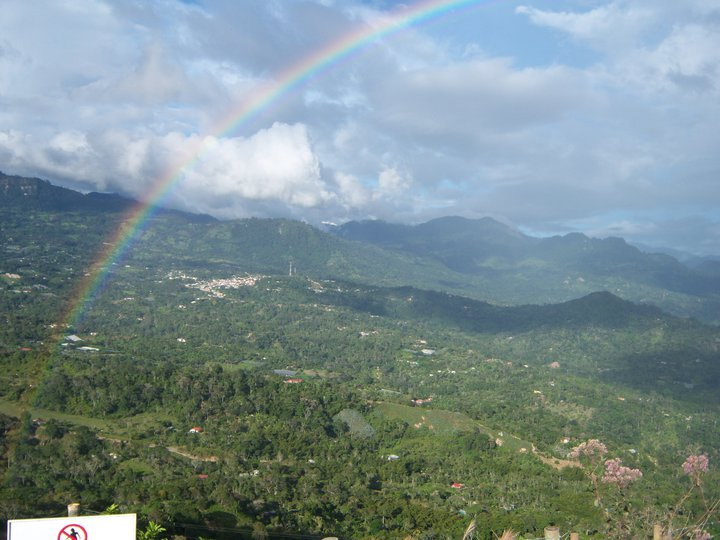
Sagipa played a crucial role in the Battle of Tocarema

Before the arrival of the Spanish conquistadors in the central highlands of present-day Colombia, the area was populated by the Muisca, ruled by the psihipqua; southern part, capital Muyquytá and hoa; northern part, capital Hunza.

Sagipa was a general in the army of the third and fourth rulers of the southern Muisca, Nemequene and Tisquesusa respectively. In this role Sagipa fought against the hoa Eucaneme. With the arrival of the Spanish in the central Colombian highlands in 1537, the northern and southern Muisca rulers conspired against the common enemy. The ruler of the northern Muisca, Eucaneme, tried to buy off the Spanish with gifts. When Sagipa's brother Tisquesusa was killed by the Spanish conquerors, Sagipa took over the rule. According to the Muisca tradition the nephew of both Sagipa and Tisquesusa, the psihipqua of Chía, should have accessed the throne. This Chiayzaque was loyal to the Spanish and Sagipa wanted to avenge the death of his brother. The caciques Cuxinimpaba and Cuxinimegua repudiated Sagipa.

The constant attacks by Sagipa and his people drove the Spanish out of the then grassy intermontane flatlands of the Bogotá savanna towards Bosa, now part of the Colombian capital. When the Panche were revolting against the new rulers in Zipacón, Sagipa took up peace negotiations with the leader of the Spanish troops, Gonzalo Jiménez de Quesada pointing to the risk for both the Muisca and the Spanish of destroyed crops by the Panche. De Quesada with only 50 soldiers and Sagipa 12,000 to 20,000 guecha warriors strong beat the Panche on 20 August 1538 in the Battle of Tocarema and celebrated the victory.

Later on Sagipa was held by the new Spanish rulers on accusation of his illegal rule. The Spanish demanded the vast amounts of gold of the inheritance of Tisquesusa. Initially Sagipa denied and went into hiding. When Sagipa saw the Muisca lost faith in his rule he surrendered to De Quesada. Outraged by his refusal to hand over the treasure Sagipa was tortured with iron bars. In early 1539 the last zipa Sagipa died in the Spanish camp in Bosa as a result of torture by the Spanish rulers.

=== Sagipa in Muisca history ===
History of the Muisca
Altiplano	Muisca	Art	Architecture	Astronomy	Cuisine	El Dorado	Subsistence	Women	Conquest

== See also ==
- Spanish conquest of the Muisca
- Muisca rulers, history of Bogotá
