= Gonzalo Jiménez de Quesada =

Spanish conquistador (1509–1579)

Adelantado Gonzalo Jiménez de Quesada
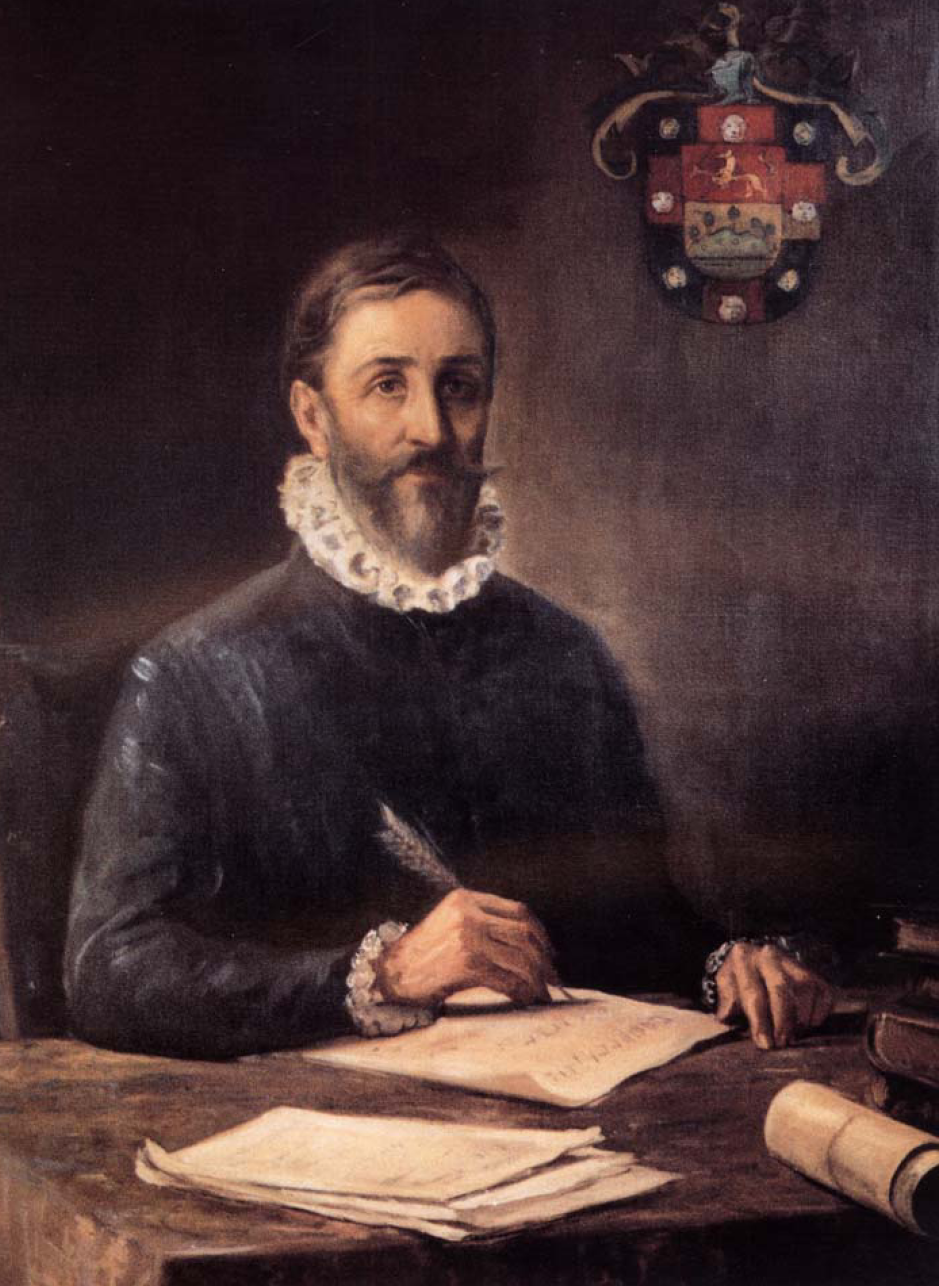
- Oil portrait of Gonzalo Jiménez de Quesada (Ricardo Gómez Campuzano, Colombian Academy of History, Bogotá)
- Born: 1509; Córdoba or Granada, Spanish Empire
- Died: 16 February 1579 (aged 70); Mariquita, New Kingdom of Granada
- Other names: Gonzalo Jiménez de Quezada; Gonzalo Ximénez de Quesada
- Occupations: Conquistador, Explorer
- Years active: 1536–1572
- Employer: Spanish Crown
- Known for: Spanish conquest of the Muisca; Spanish conquest of New Granada; Founder of Bogotá; First mayor of Bogotá; Quest for El Dorado
- Notable work: Apuntamientos y anotaciones sobre la historia de Paulo Jovio, obispo de Nochera (1566)
- Parents: Gonzalo Ximenez de Quesada, the elder (father); Isabel de Quesada (mother)
- Relatives: Hernán Pérez de Quesada (brother); Francisco Jiménez de Quesada (brother); Melchor de Quesada (brother); Catalina Magdalena de Quesada (sister); Andrea Ximénez de Quesada (sister); Isabel de Quesada (half-sister)

Mayor of Bogotá
- In office 1538–1539
- Preceded by: Position established; previously the final zipa Sagipa.
- Succeeded by: Jerónimo de Inza

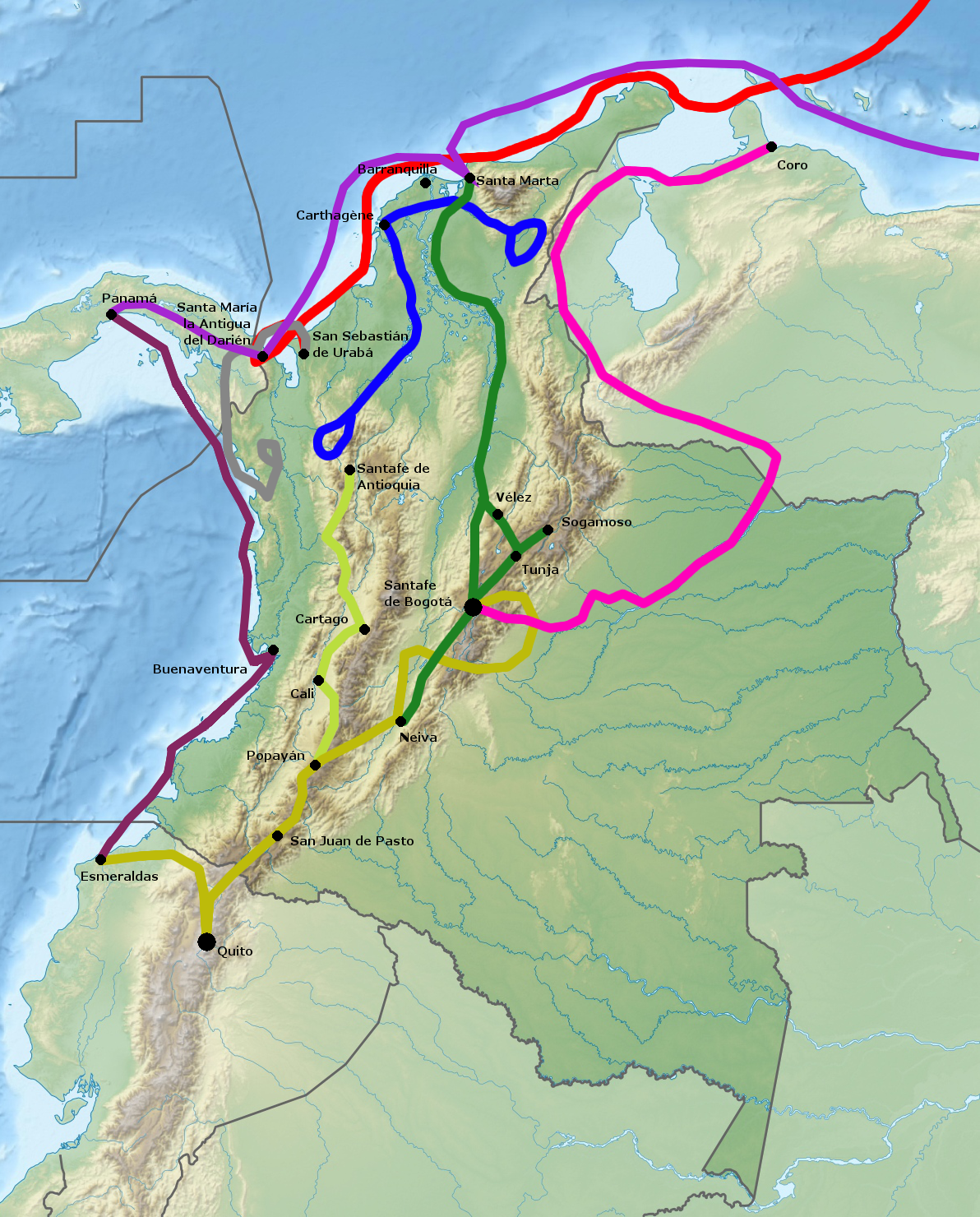
Routes of Spanish conquest Green is De Quesada's approximate trajectory Note: route around the Sierra Nevada de Santa Marta incorrectly drawn

Gonzalo Jiménez de Quesada y Rivera, also spelled as Ximénez and De Quezada, (Spanish: [gonˈθalo xiˈmeneθ ðe keˈsaða]; 1509 – 16 February 1579) was a Spanish explorer and conquistador in northern South America, territories currently known as Colombia. He explored the territory named by him, New Kingdom of Granada, and founded its capital, Santafé de Bogotá. As a well-educated lawyer he was one of the intellectuals of the Spanish conquest. He was an effective organizer and leader, designed the first legislation for the government of the area, and was its historian. He was governor of Cartagena between 1556 and 1557, and after 1569 he undertook explorations toward the east, searching for the elusive El Dorado. The campaign didn't succeed and Jiménez then returned to New Granada in 1573. He has been suggested as a possible model for Cervantes' Don Quixote.

== Family ==
His father, Luis Jiménez de Quesada, was a hidalgo relative of Gonzalo Francisco de Cordoba, and he had two well-known distant cousins, the conquistadores of Mexico and Peru respectively: Hernán Cortés and Francisco Pizarro. He had three younger brothers; Hernán and Francisco, who also were conquistadors, and Melchor, a priest, and a sister, Andrea.

== Conquest of the Muisca Confederation ==
De Quesada was an Andalusian lawyer, trained in Granada. He was appointed chief magistrate in 1535 and second in command for an expedition to present-day Colombia, because in that period he was not in good standing with the people at home because he had just lost an important court case in which his mother's family was economically involved. The commander of the expedition, Pedro Fernández de Lugo (governor of the Canary Islands), had bought the governorship of Santa Marta and had equipped a fleet and assembled over a thousand men. And so they set sail to Santa Marta, thinking they would find a very rich land, full of gold and pearls. But when, after two month of navigation, they reached the small coastal settlement of Santa Marta, all they found was a conglomeration of hovels and filthy, disease-ridden colonists who went about dressed in skins or roughly woven and padded cotton clothes made by the natives from surrounding areas. Soon food became scarce and tropical fevers began to smite down the strongest.

In 1536, De Quesada was chosen by De Lugo to command an expedition to explore into the interior of New Granada, hoping to discover the dreamed El Dorado. A land party under De Quesada, with Hernán Pérez de Quesada (his brother), Juan San Martín, Juan del Junco (as second in command) Lázaro Fonte and Sergio Bustillo, struck south from Santa Marta, crossed the Cesar River, and arrived at Tamalameque on the Magdalena River. A support fleet of 6 (or 5) ships had also sailed from Santa Marta with 900 men to navigate the Magdalena. Only two of the vessels actually arrived at Tamalameque, and subsequently returned to Santa Marta with many of De Quesada's men. Continuing up the Magdalena as far as La Tora (Barrancabermeja), De Quesada and his men ascended the Opon River into the cordillera, reaching the Opon hills, Chipata (near Vélez) (March 1537) and the valley of the Suárez River. Passing Lake Fúquene and Lake Suesca, they reached Nemocón and Zipaquirá and finally entered the Muisca Confederation (ruled from Muyquytá, present day Funza and Hunza, on which the Spanish city Tunja was founded).

Only 180 men out of 800 survived, suffering terribly in the jungle: they were forced to eat snakes, lizards, frogs, and even the leather torn from their harnesses and the scabbards of their swords. In Bogotá, Quesada resigned and called for an election; he was elected captain-general, and threw off the last link that held him to the governor. The Muisca had two rulers. The psihipqua Bogotá, ruled in Muyquytá; the other, the hoa Eucaneme, ruled in Hunza. Taking advantage of a war between the two chiefdoms, Quesada's force subdued Muyquytá and then successfully attacked Hunza. At this point it was time to establish a settlement so that the earth itself might properly belong to De Quesada and his men. They chose a spot next to the towering peaks of the east, where the land was high and the rains would quickly run off, where the mountains would protect them from attackers and the jungles below. Quesada placed his right foot on the bare earth and said simply, "I take possession of this land in the name of the most sovereign emperor, Charles V."

Quesada remained in the region until the arrival of two expeditions at the end of 1538: Sebastián de Belalcázar from Quito, modern-day capital of Ecuador, one of the captains of Pizarro who had mutinied against his leader; and Nikolaus Federmann, a German from Venezuela. The three captains met on the savanna of New Granada. All three wanted to claim New Granada for themselves. In order to resolve their dispute, De Quesada persuaded them to go back to Spain with him and to submit their rival territorial claims to the arbitration of the crown. In July 1539, they sailed for Spain from Cartagena. However, none of them obtained the governorship. De Quesada, after nearly a dozen years of wandering disconsolately through the gaming halls of Europe, returned to New Granada in 1550. Here, he settled down to live for nearly thirty years. He was a respected settler, becoming the most influential man in the Kingdom. He protected his fellow colonists from the severity of the officials and restrained the encomenderos (large landholders) greed. But his own desire for wealth and gold continued to live inside him.

== Later expeditions ==
In 1569, at the age of 63, De Quesada received a commission to conquer the Llanos to the east of the Colombian cordillera. From Bogotá in April 1569 with 500 mounted soldiers, 1500 natives, 1100 horses and pack animals, 600 head of cattle, 800 pigs, a large number of negro slaves and 8 priests, he first descended to Mesetas on the upper Guejar River. There most of the livestock was destroyed by a grass fire. De Quesada's expedition then moved to nearby San Juan de los Llanos, where a course was set for east-southeast (by the guide Pedro Soleto), and maintained for the following two years. After a year or so some men returned with Juan Maldonado, reaching San Juan after six months with few survivors. De Quesada eventually reached (San Fernando de) Atabapo at the confluence of the Guaviare and the Orinoco (in December 1571), any further movement requiring the construction of ships. He therefore dejectedly returned to Bogotá, arriving in December 1572 with only 25 Spaniards, 4 natives, 18 horses and 2 priests. The expedition had been one of the most expensive disasters on record. After a brief period of service in a frontier command (during which he suppressed an indigenous uprising) De Quesada, affected by leprosy, overcome with despair at his debts, owing more than 60 thousand ducats, was forced to seek a milder climate and died quietly, aged 70, in Mariquita, an important market town in the New Kingdom of Granada.

=== Death and legacy ===
After his death in Mariquita, he was buried in the Santa Lucía Abbey. His remains were there until 1597, when they were exhumed and transferred to Bogotá, the city founded by him.

=== Placed named for de Quesada ===
- Avenida Jiménez, street in central Bogotá
  - Avenida Jiménez (TransMilenio), TransMilenio station serving this avenue
- Conjunto Multifamiliar Torres Gonzalo Jiménez de Quesada, a five-tower residential complex in Bogotá

== Gallery ==
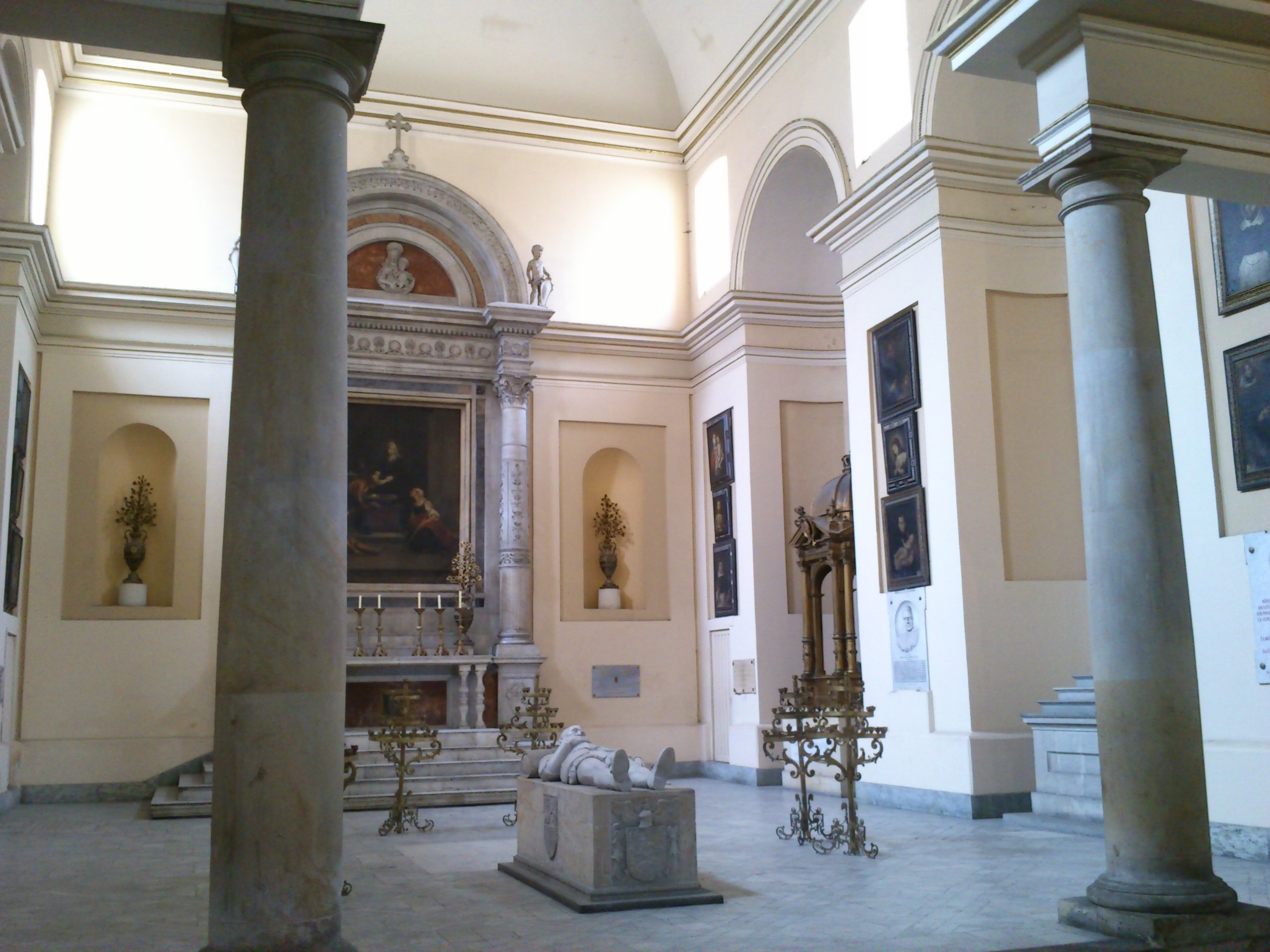
Tomb in Primate Cathedral of Bogotá

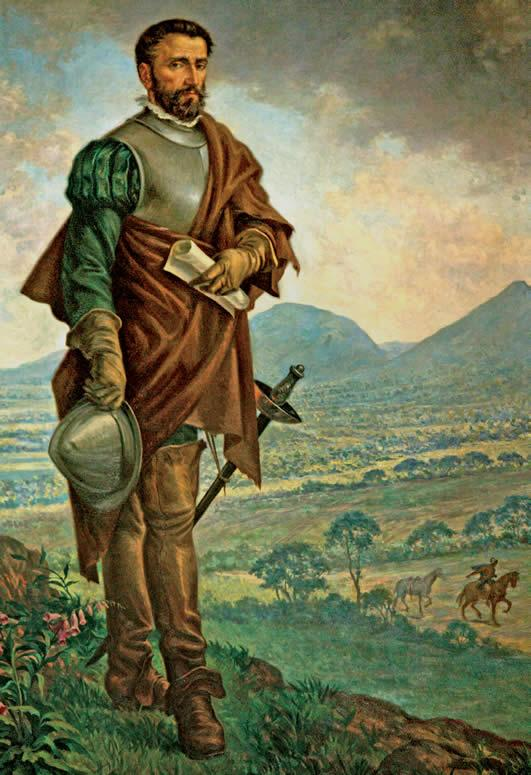
Jiménez de Quesada

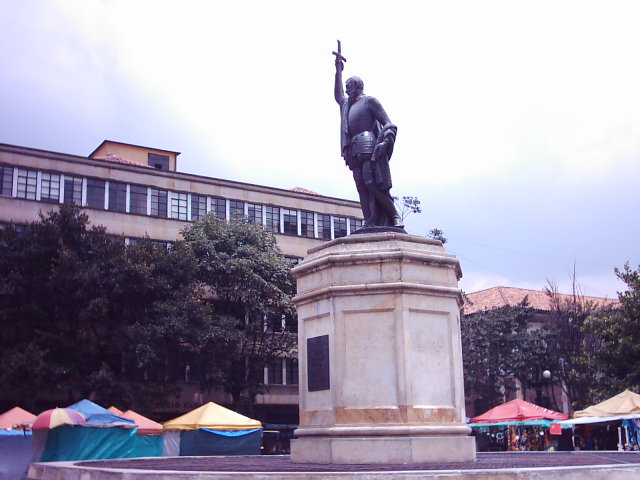
Statue

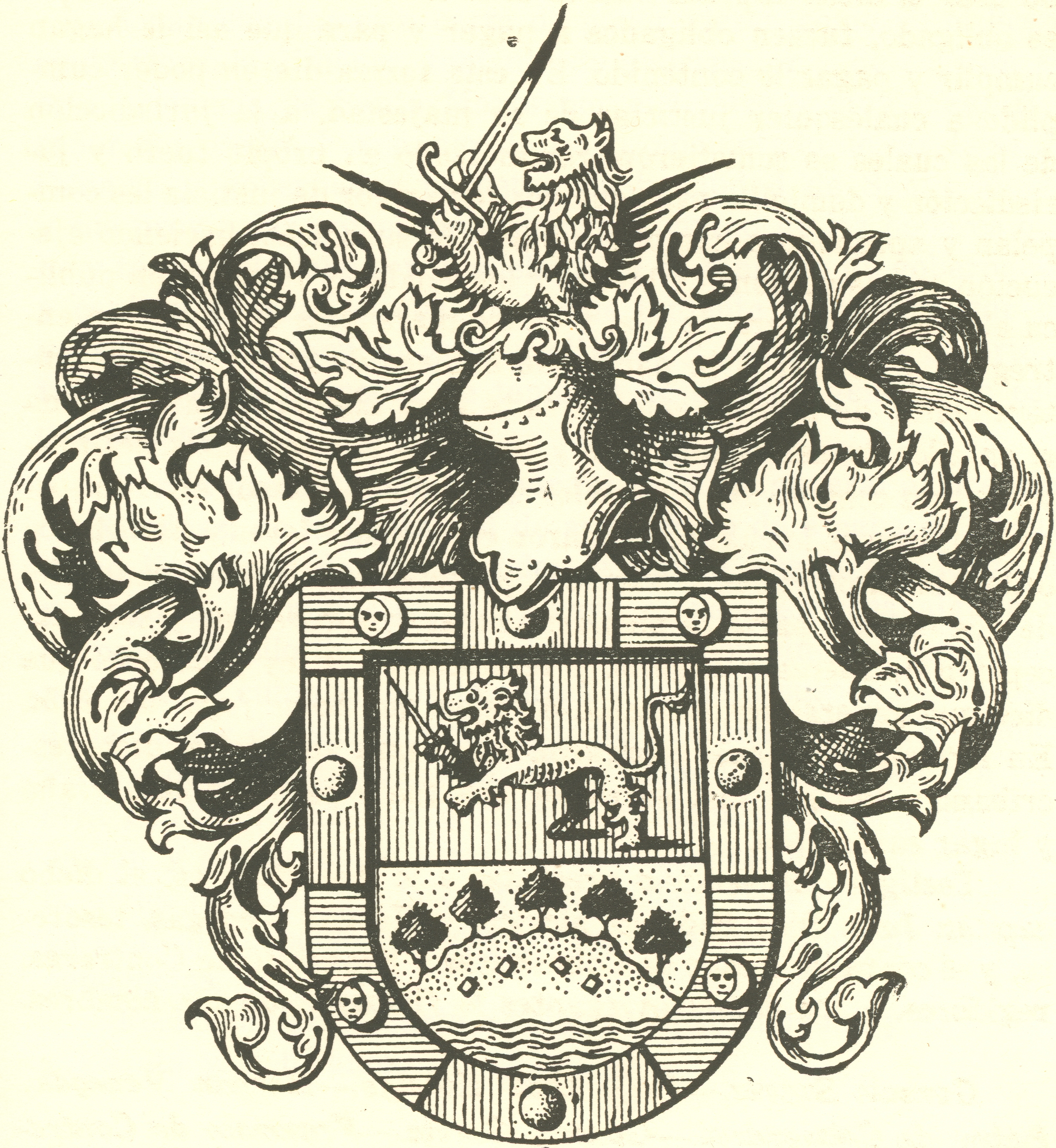
Coat of arms

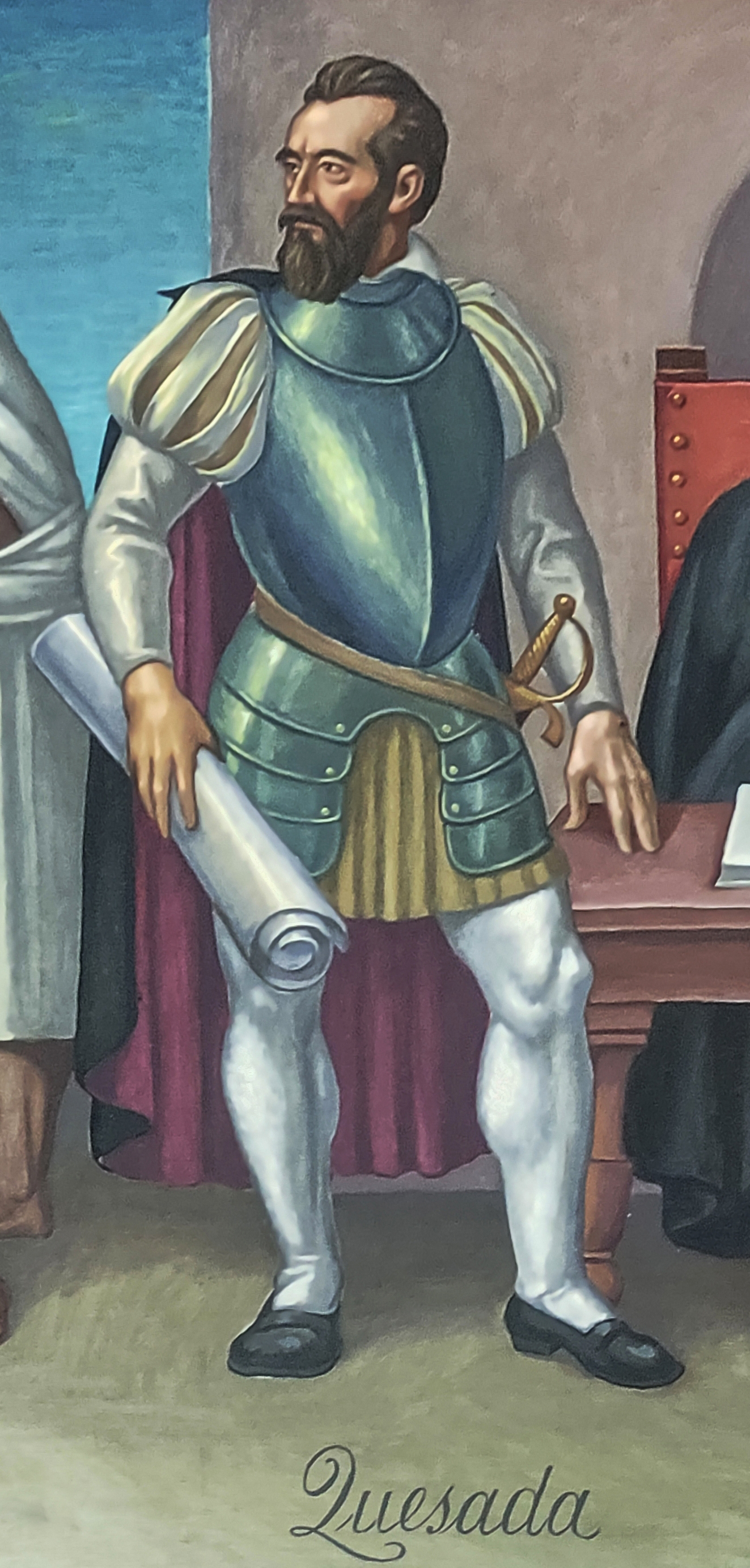
Jiménez de Quesada by Luis Alberto Acuña

== See also ==
- List of conquistadors in Colombia
- Hernán Pérez de Quesada, Juan de Céspedes
- New Kingdom of Granada, Paolo Giovio

== Bibliography ==
- Cunningham Graham, R. B. (1922). The Conquest of New Granada, Being the Life of Gonzalo Jimenez de Quesada. London: W. Heinemann.

== Works by Jiménez de Quesada ==
- Jiménez de Quesada, Gonzalo (1567). Memoria de los descubridores, que entraron conmigo a descubrir y conquistar el Nuevo Reino de Granada (in Spanish).
