= Juan Tafur =

Spanish conquistador

- Born: 1500; Córdoba, Spain
- Died: New Kingdom of Granada
- Occupations: Conquistador
- Years active: 1518-1541
- Employer: Spanish Crown
- Known for: Spanish conquest of the Muisca; Construction of first church of Chipaque
- Spouses: N.N, Antonia Manuel de Hoyos; Francisca de Ulloa
- Children: 1
- Relatives: Cousins: Martín Yañéz Tafur; Hernán Venegas Carrillo; Pedro Fernández de Valenzuela

Encomendero of Bogotá
- In office 1541–1541
- Preceded by: Antonio Díaz de Cardoso
- Succeeded by: Juan Díaz Hidalgo
- In office 1546–1547
- Preceded by: Juan de Céspedes
- Succeeded by: Pedro de Colmenares
- In office 1552–1552
- Preceded by: Juan Muñoz de Collantes
- Succeeded by: Gonzalo Rodríguez de Ledesma
- In office 1554–1554
- Preceded by: Gonzalo García Zorro
- Succeeded by: Juan Ruiz de Orejuela
- In office 1559–1559
- Preceded by: Gonzalo Rodríguez de Ledesma
- Succeeded by: Antonio Bermúdez

Juan Tafur (born 1500, death date unknown) was a Spanish conquistador who participated in the Spanish conquest of the Muisca people. He was a cousin of fellow conquistadors Martín Yañéz Tafur, Hernán Venegas Carrillo and Pedro Fernández de Valenzuela. Juan Tafur was five times encomendero (mayor) of Santa Fe de Bogotá. He also received the encomiendas of Pasca, Chipaque and Usaquén. The encomienda of Suesca was shared between Tafur and Gonzalo García Zorro.

Knowledge of the life of Juan Tafur has been provided by the work El Carnero (1638), by chronicler Juan Rodríguez Freyle.

== Biography ==
=== Family ===
Juan Tafur was born in 1500 in Córdoba, Spain. His parents were Juan Pérez Tubera and Isabel Díaz Tafur. Tafur took the surname of his mother. Other family members were also conquistadors: Pedro Fernández de Valenzuela, Hernán Venegas Carrillo and Martín Yañés Tafur.

=== American expeditions ===
In 1518 he left Spain for the New World under the command of Pedro de los Ríos, governor of Tierra Firme in Panama. De los Ríos sent Tafur with two ships to retrieve the dissatisfied members of the Pizarro expedition. In 1531 or 1533, Tafur left for Santa Marta, where he was sent to the Valle de Upar, together with conquistadors Antonio de Lebrija, Juan de Sanct Martín, Juan Muñoz de Collantes and Juan de Céspedes to force the submission the Chimila people to the Spanish.

In April 1536, Tafur was appointed cavalry leader in the expedition led by Gonzalo Jiménez de Quesada which left the Caribbean city of Santa Marta in search of El Dorado. Tafur participated in the Spanish conquest of the Muisca people and received the encomiendas of Pasca, Usaque, Itaque and Chipaque, where he built the first church in 1538. The encomienda of Suesca was shared between Juan Tafur and Gonzalo García Zorro.

=== Mayoralties ===
Juan Tafur was five times encomendero of Santa Fe de Bogotá: in 1541 succeeding Antonio Díaz de Cardoso and preceding Juan Díaz Hidalgo; from 1546 to 1547 succeeding Juan de Céspedes and succeeded by Pedro de Colmenares; in 1552 between the reigns of Juan Muñoz de Collantes and Gonzalo Rodríguez de Ledesma; in 1554 succeeding Gonzalo García Zorro and before Juan Ruiz de Orejuela; and finally in 1559 after the rule of Gonzalo Rodríguez de Ledesma and preceding Antonio Bermúdez. In 1552, he requested 72 emeralds from Diego de Aguilar.

=== Mistreatment of native Americans ===
He committed various atrocities against the indigenous people, including against the Panche people to the west of the Bogotá savanna. He mistreated the Cacique (leader) of Pasca and the Cacique of Chita, whose body he threw at the dogs. In 1543, he was convicted for the mistreatment of the indigenous Muisca of Pasca.

=== Personal life ===
Juan Tafur was married three times: to an unnamed woman; to Antonia Manuel de Hoyos; and to Francisca de Ulloa. He had a daughter named Isabel Tafur.

== Encomiendas ==
Encomiendas of Juan Tafur on and around the Bogotá savanna

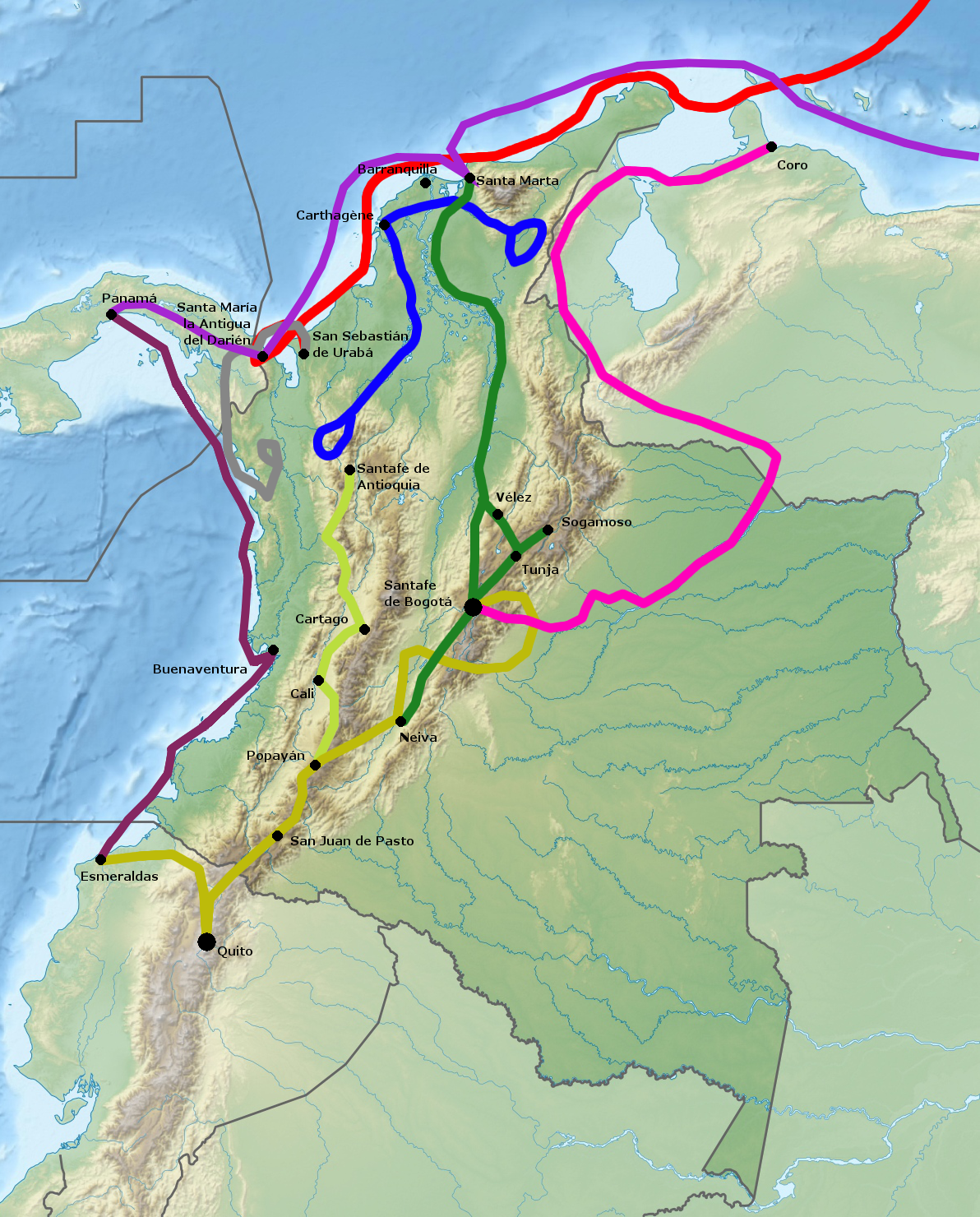
Juan Tafur was one of the soldiers in the expedition along the green route from Santa Marta into the Muisca Confederation

== See also ==
- List of conquistadors in Colombia
- Spanish conquest of the Muisca
- Hernán Pérez de Quesada, Juan de Céspedes
- Gonzalo Jiménez de Quesada

== Bibliography ==
- Acosta, Joaquín (1848), Compendio histórico del descubrimiento y colonización de la Nueva Granada en el siglo décimo sexto - Historical overview of discovery and colonization of New Granada in the sixteenth century (PDF), Paris: Beau Press, pp. 1–460, OCLC 23030434, archived from the original (PDF) on 2012-08-18
- Rodríguez Freyle, Juan; Achury Valenzuela, Darío (1979) [1859 (1638)], El Carnero - Conquista i descubrimiento del nuevo reino de Granada de las Indias Occidentales del mar oceano, i fundacion de la ciudad de Santa Fe de Bogota (in Spanish), Fundacion Biblioteca Ayacuch, pp. 1–592, ISBN 978-84-660-0025-3
