= Antonio de Lebrija (conquistador) =

Spanish conquistador

- Born: 1507; Alcántara, Extremadura, Spain
- Died: 1540 (aged 32–33); Brozas, Extremadura, Spain
- Other names: Antonio de Nebrija
- Occupations: Conquistador
- Years active: 1529–1539
- Employer: Spanish Crown
- Known for: Conquest of the Chimila; Conquest of the Muisca
- Relatives: Antonio de Nebrija (grandfather?)

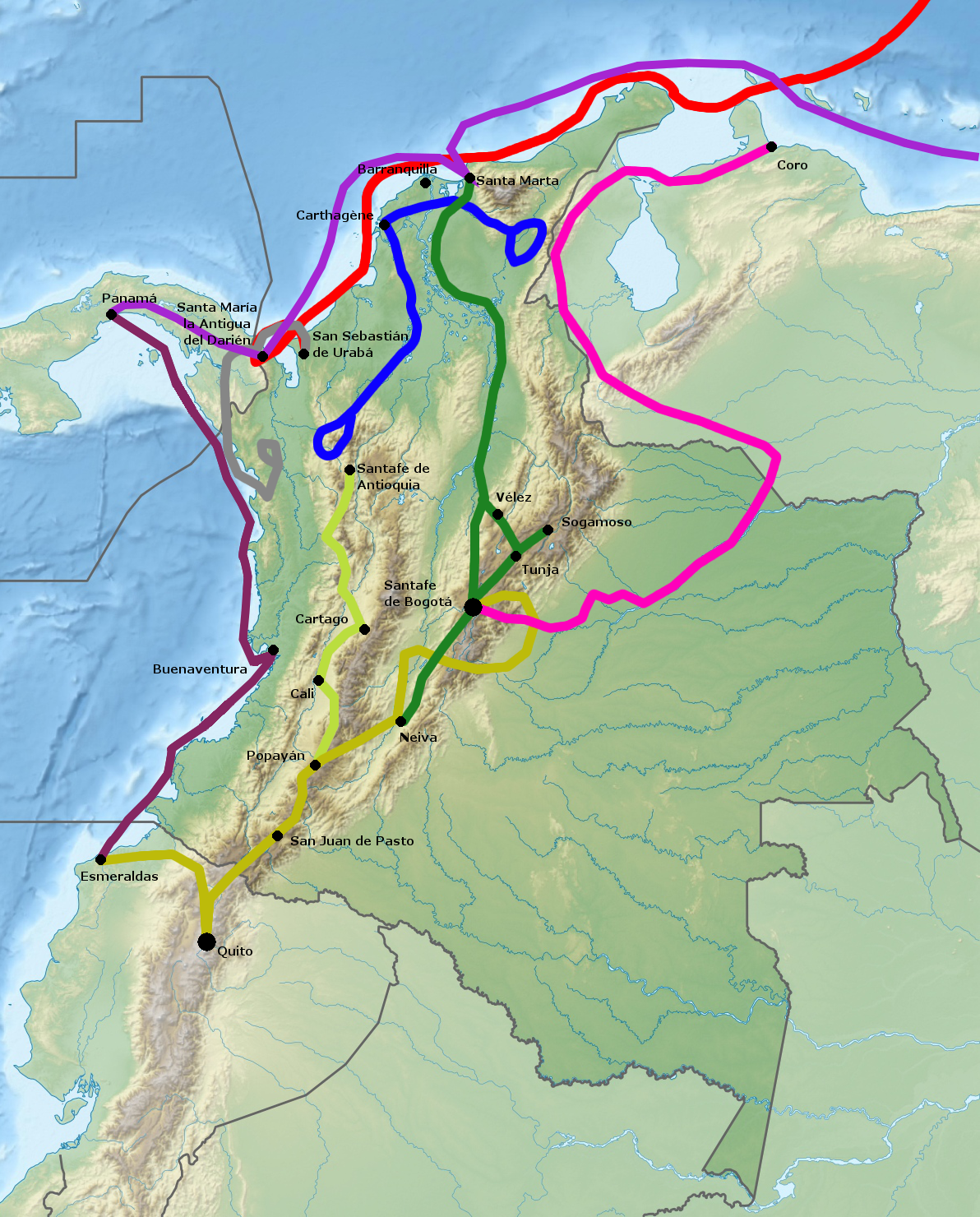
Antonio de Lebríja was the treasurer of the expedition along the green route from Santa Marta into the Muisca Confederation

Antonio de Lebrija (1507–1540) was a Spanish conquistador who participated in the Spanish conquest of the Muisca and the Chimila peoples. He was the treasurer of the conquest expedition which left Santa Marta in April 1536 following the high-quality salt trail, the Camino de la Sal, along the Suárez River up the slopes of the Eastern Ranges of the Colombian Andes towards the Muisca Confederation.

== Expeditions ==
=== Early explorations ===
Antonio de Lebrija was born in Alcántara in Extremadura in 1507, possibly a grandson of his namesake, historian and humanist Antonio de Nebrija. He left Spain for the New World with García de Lerma, arriving at Santa Marta in 1529. Under the command of de Lerma's nephew, Pedro de Lerma, de Lebrija participated in the conquest of the Chimila people in the Valle de Upar, Cesar. Here he discovered the confluence of the Magdalena River with the tributary that received his name, the Lebrija River.

As captain and treasurer, with seven years of experience in Tierra Firme, de Lebrija joined the expedition in search of El Dorado, which was led by Gonzalo Jiménez de Quesada and left Santa Marta in April 1536.

=== Foundation of Bogotá ===
In 1538, on the Bogotá savanna, De Quesada sent De Lebrija, along with Juan de Céspedes, Juan de San Martín, and Gómez del Corral ahead to locate the most favourable site to found the capital of the New Kingdom of Granada. They selected a location in Teusaquillo, where Santa Fe de Bogotá was founded on August 6, 1538.

=== Return to Spain ===
After the two conquistadors Nikolaus Federmann and Sebastián de Belalcázar arrived in Bogotá, De Lebrija departed with De Quesada, and fellow conquistador Juan de Albarracín for Guataquí, a town they had founded. Guataquí, on the Magdalena River, was the port where De Albarracín ordered the construction of two small boats by the indigenous Panche people. From here, the Spanish conquistadors left for Cartagena, from where they sailed back to Spain. In Cartagena, in July 1539, de Lebrija authored a letter to the Real Audiencia of Santo Domingo, describing the activities in the New Kingdom. De Lebrija died in 1540 in Brozas, Extremadura.

== Epítome ==
Antonio de Lebríja is mentioned as Librixa, and in the early chronicle about the Spanish conquest, a work of uncertain authorship, Epítome de la conquista del Nuevo Reino de Granada.

== Named after Antonio de Lebrija ==
- Lebrija, Santander
- Lebrija River, Santander

== See also ==
- List of conquistadors in Colombia
- Spanish conquest of the Muisca
- Hernán Pérez de Quesada, Juan de Céspedes
- Gonzalo Jiménez de Quesada, Juan de Albarracín, Juan de San Martín

== Bibliography ==
- Friede, Juan (1960), Descubrimiento del Nuevo Reino de Granada y Fundación de Bogotá (1536–1539), Banco de la República, pp. 1–342
- Pita Pico, Roger (2013), "Vestigios de la lengua Guane: una aproximación al fenómeno del mestizaje idiomático en Santaner – Guane vestiges of language: an approach to the phenomenon of linguistic miscegenation in Santander" (PDF), Linguïstica y literatura, 63: 295–316, doi:10.17533/udea.lyl.16187
- Rodríguez Freyle, Juan; Achury Valenzuela, Darío (1979) [1859 (1638)], El Carnero – Conquista i descubrimiento del nuevo reino de Granada de las Indias Occidentales del mar oceano, i fundacion de la ciudad de Santa Fe de Bogota (in Spanish), Fundacion Biblioteca Ayacuch, pp. 1–592, ISBN 978-84-660-0025-3
- Salcedo Salcedo, Jaime (2011), "Un vestigio del cercado del señor de Bogotá en la traza de Santafe" (PDF), Ensayos. Historia y teoría del arte, 20: 155–190
- "Epítome de la conquista del Nuevo Reino de Granada", Boletín Cultural y Bibliográfico, 16 (3), Banco de la República: 81–97, 1979 [1889 (1539)]
