= Pedro Fernández de Valenzuela =

Pedro Fernández de Valenzuela may refer to:

- Pedro Fernández de Valenzuela (conquistador) (active 1536–1538), Cordobese conquistador who took part in the Spanish conquest of the Muisca and died in Córdoba, Spain
- Pedro Fernández de Valenzuela (rector) (died 1572), Cordobese first rector of the University of Lima who traveled to the Viceroyalty of Peru and died in Lima
