= Antonio de Lebrija =

Antonio de Lebrija may refer to:

- Antonio de Nebrija (1441–1522), also written as Antonio de Lebrija, Spanish historian and humanist
- Antonio de Lebrija (conquistador) (1507–1540), possibly his grandson, conquistador in Colombia
