= Simití =

Coordinates: 7°58′N 73°57′W

- Municipality and town
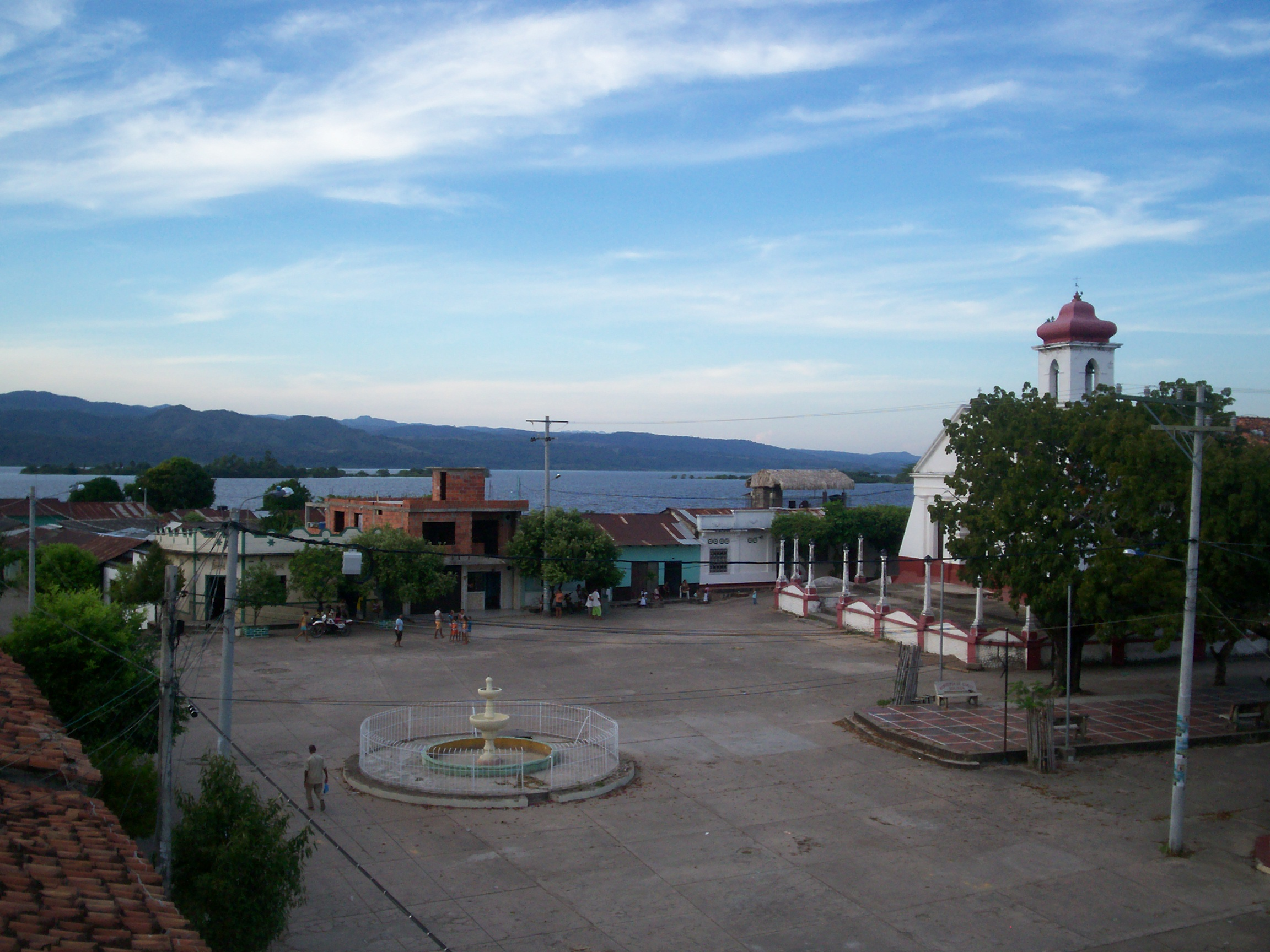

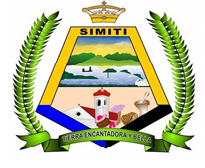
- Flag Coat of arms

- Location of the municipality and town of Simití in the Bolívar Department of Colombia
- Country: Colombia
- Department: Bolívar Department
- Founded: 1537
- Founder: Antonio de Lebrija & Juan Maldonado

Population (Census 2018)
  - Total: 15,353
- Time zone: UTC-5 (Colombia Standard Time)

Simiti is a town and municipality located in the Bolívar Department, northern Colombia.

== History ==
Simití was founded in 1537 by Antonio de Lebrija and Juan Maldonado, two soldiers of the expedition from Santa Marta to the Muisca Confederation, led by Gonzalo Jiménez de Quesada.
