= Antonio Díaz de Cardoso =

Portuguese conquistador

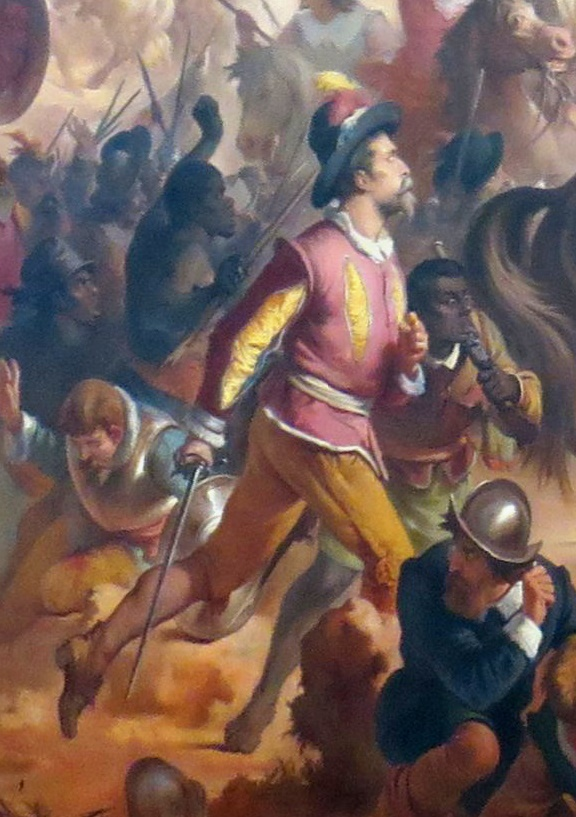
- Born: 1495; Santa Comba, Portugal
- Died: 1573 (aged 77–78); New Kingdom of Granada
- Other name: Díaz (de) Cardozo
- Occupations: Conquistador
- Years active: 1526-1541
- Employer: Spanish Crown
- Known for: Spanish conquest of the Muisca
- Spouse: Felipa de Almeyda Cabral
- Children: 2

Encomendero of Bogotá
- In office 1540–1541
- Preceded by: Juan Arévalo
- Succeeded by: Juan Tafur
- In office 1562–1563
- Preceded by: Juan de Rivera
- Succeeded by: Alonso de Olaya
- In office 1567–1568
- Preceded by: Antón de Olaya
- Succeeded by: Gonzalo de Ledesma

Antonio Díaz de Cardoso (1495, in Santa Comba, Portugal – 1573 in Santafe de Bogotá) was a Portuguese conquistador who participated in the Spanish conquest of the Muisca people.

Antonio Díaz de Cardoso is mentioned as Cardosso in the early chronicles of the Spanish conquest, a work of uncertain authorship; Epítome de la conquista del Nuevo Reino de Granada.

== Biography ==
=== Birth and name ===
Antonio Díaz de Cardoso, whose surnames are alternatively spelled Díaz Cardoso, Díaz de Cardozo or Díaz Cardozo, was born in Santa Comba in the Kingdom of Portugal.

=== American expeditions ===
Díaz de Cardoso joined the expedition in search of El Dorado, the journey led by Gonzalo Jiménez de Quesada which left Santa Marta in April 1536. Antonio Díaz de Cardoso was one of the captains of the three brigs that De Quesada sent up the Magdalena River; the other two were Gómez del Corral and Juan de Albarracín.

From La Tora, present Barrancabermeja, De Quesada sent troops ahead to investigate routes towards the then unknown Andes. Díaz de Cardoso and De Albarracín found the loafs of high quality salt that would lead the conquistadors along the Camino de la Sal ("Salt Route") into the Muisca Confederation.

=== Mayortlties ===
Díaz de Cardoso received the encomienda (mayoralty) of Suba, and ruled over 900 to 1000 Muisca.

Antonio Díaz de Cardoso was three times encomendero (mayor) of Santa Fe de Bogotá; from 1540 to 1541 between the terms of Juan Arévalo and Juan Tafur, between 1562 and 1563 succeeding Juan de Rivera and preceding Alonso de Olaya and from 1567 to 1568 as successor to Antón de Olaya and succeeded by Gonzalo de Ledesma.

=== Personal life ===
Díaz de Cardoso was married to Felipa Almeida, or Felipa de Almeyda Cabral, and the couple had two daughters.

== See also ==
- List of conquistadors in Colombia
- Spanish conquest of the Muisca
- Hernán Pérez de Quesada
- Gonzalo Suárez Rendón, Gonzalo Jiménez de Quesada

== Bibliography ==
- N, N (1979) [1889 (1539)], "Epítome de la conquista del Nuevo Reino de Granada", Boletín Cultural y Bibliográfico, 16 (3), Banco de la República: 81–97
