= Juan de Albarracín =

Spanish conquistador

- Born: Castile
- Died: Castile
- Occupations: Conquistador
- Years active: 1536–1539
- Employer: Spanish Crown
- Known for: Spanish conquest of the Muisca
- Spouse: Ana de Lugo
- Children: Jacome, Alvaro, Alonso de Lugo Albarracín (sons); Inés, Sebastiana, Catalina de Lugo Albarracín (daughters)
- Relatives: Pedro de Lugo (father-in-law)

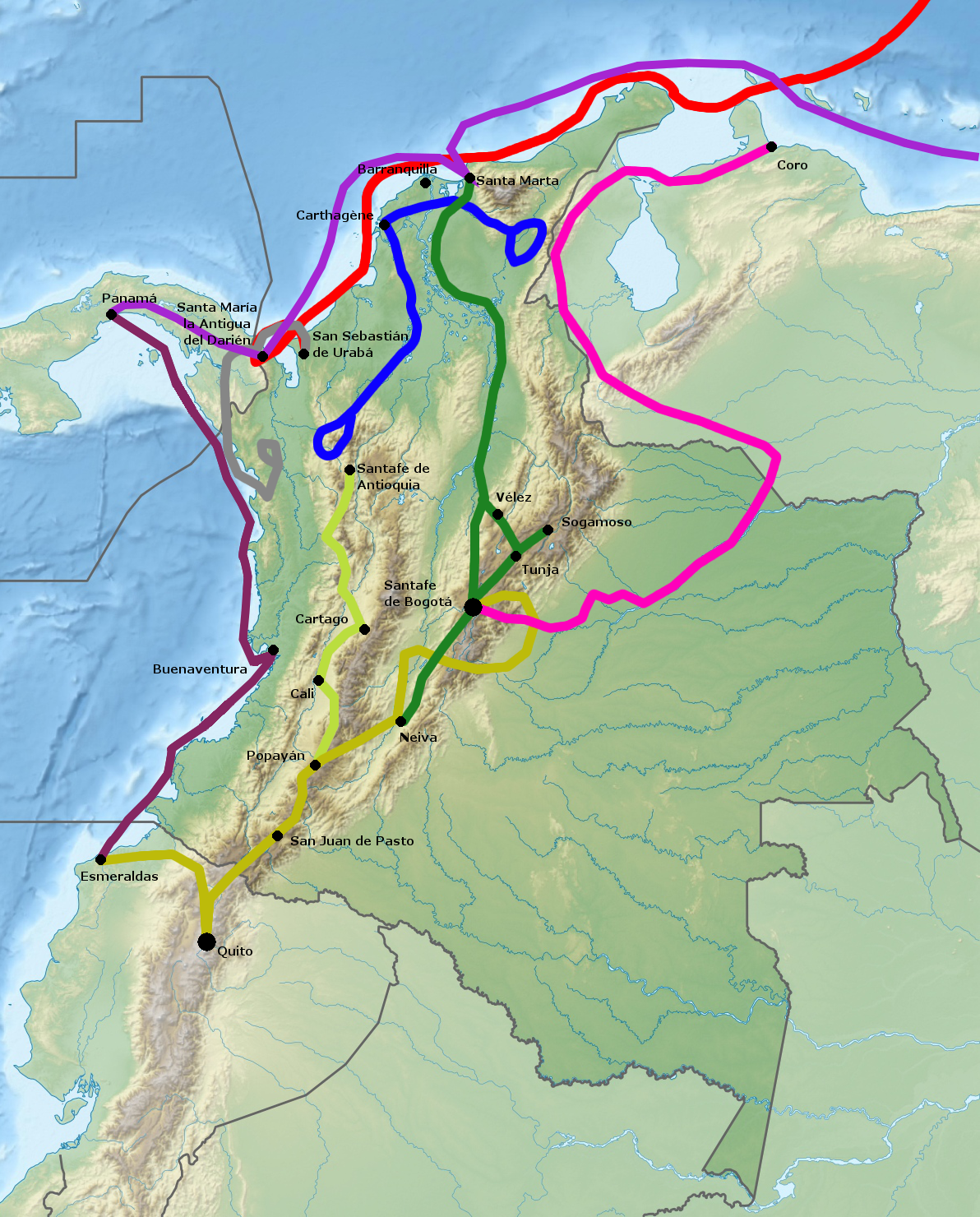
Juan de Albarracín was one of the brig captains in the expedition along the green route from Santa Marta into the Muisca Confederation

Juan de Albarracín was a Spanish conquistador who participated in the Spanish conquest of the Muisca and Panche people. He was captain of the brigs which sailed up the Magdalena River from the Caribbean coast in 1536 and later discovered the high quality salt that lead the Spanish conquistadors along the Camino de la Sal up the slopes of the eastern ranges of the Colombian Andes towards the Muisca Confederation.

== Discovering the Salt Route ==
De Albarracín left Spain with his father-in-law Pedro de Lugo for the New World, arriving in January 1536 in Santa Marta. De Albarracín taught the men under his command to fish for pearls, near Cabo de la Vela in northernmost present-day Colombia. De Albarracín joined the expedition in search of El Dorado, the journey led by Gonzalo Jiménez de Quesada which left Santa Marta in April 1536. Juan de Albarracín was one of the three captains of the brigs that De Quesada sent up the Magdalena River; the other two were Gómez del Corral and Antonio Díaz de Cardoso.

During the strenuous journey, in La Tora, present-day Barrancabermeja, De Quesada sent troops ahead to investigate routes towards the then unknown Andes. De Albarracín and Díaz de Cardoso found the loafs of high quality salt that would lead the conquistadors along the Camino de la Sal or "Salt Route" into the Muisca Confederation.

== Further travels ==
Together with Martín Galeano De Albarracín participated in battles against the bellicose Panche people, commanded by Juan de Céspedes. When the two conquistadors Nikolaus Federmann and Sebastián de Belalcázar had arrived on the Bogotá savanna after the foundation of Bogotá as capital of the New Kingdom of Granada by De Quesada on August 6, 1538, they left with De Albarracín for Guataquí, a town they founded. In Guataquí, on the Magdalena River, he ordered the construction of two small boats by indigenous people to sail the conquistadors back to Spain via Cartagena.

De Albarracín settled in a mansion in Jérez de la Frontera and never returned to the New Kingdom.

== Personal life ==
De Albarracín was married to Ana de Lugo, who sailed to the new world with him, and the couple had three sons and three daughters. His grandson Pedro de Lugo Albarracin was the sculptor of various images of Jesus Christ in the Colombian capital Bogota. De Albarracín died in Spain in an unknown year.

Juan de Albarracín is mentioned as "Albarracín" in the early chronicle about the Spanish conquest, a work of uncertain authorship; Epítome de la conquista del Nuevo Reino de Granada.

== See also ==
- List of conquistadors in Colombia
- Spanish conquest of the Muisca
- Hernán Pérez de Quesada, Juan de Céspedes
- Gonzalo Jiménez de Quesada, Martín Galeano

== Bibliography ==
- De Castellanos, Juan (1857) [1589], Elegías de varones ilustres de Indias (in Spanish), Pontificia Universidad Javeriana, pp. 1–567, ISBN 978-958-683-677-7
- Prieto, Edgar Eduardo (2009), Centro histórico de Honda: puesta en valor e inserción del siglo XXI (PDF), Universidad La Javeriana, pp. 1–213
- Rodríguez Freyle, Juan; Achury Valenzuela, Darío (1979) [1859 (1638)], El Carnero – Conquista i descubrimiento del nuevo reino de Granada de las Indias Occidentales del mar oceano, i fundacion de la ciudad de Santa Fe de Bogota (in Spanish), Fundacion Biblioteca Ayacuch, pp. 1–592, ISBN 978-84-660-0025-3
- Epítome de la conquista del Nuevo Reino de Granada, Banco de la República, 1979 [1889 (1539)], pp. 81–97
