= Brozas =

Brozas, Spain
- municipality
- Coat of arms

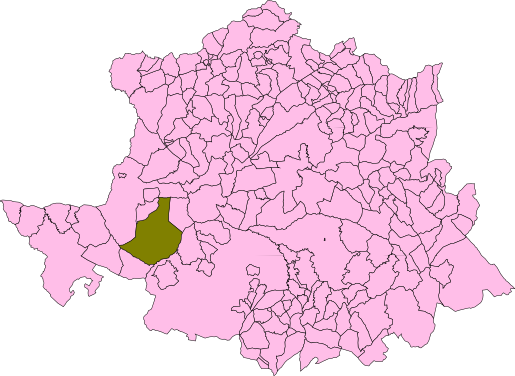
- Coordinates: 39°36′N 6°46′W
- Country: Spain
- Autonomous community: Extremadura
- Province: Cáceres
- Municipality: Brozas

Area
  - Total: 397 km^{2} (153 sq mi)
- Elevation: 411 m (1,348 ft)

Population (2025-01-01)
  - Total: 1,718
  - Density: 4.33/km^{2} (11.2/sq mi)
- Time zone: UTC+1 (CET)
  - Summer (DST): UTC+2 (CEST)

Brozas is a municipality located in the province of Cáceres, Extremadura, Spain. According to the 2006 census (INE), the municipality has a population of 2248 inhabitants. The climate is of Mediterranean type, with an average temperature of 16,4 °C and an average rainfall of 460 L/m ²

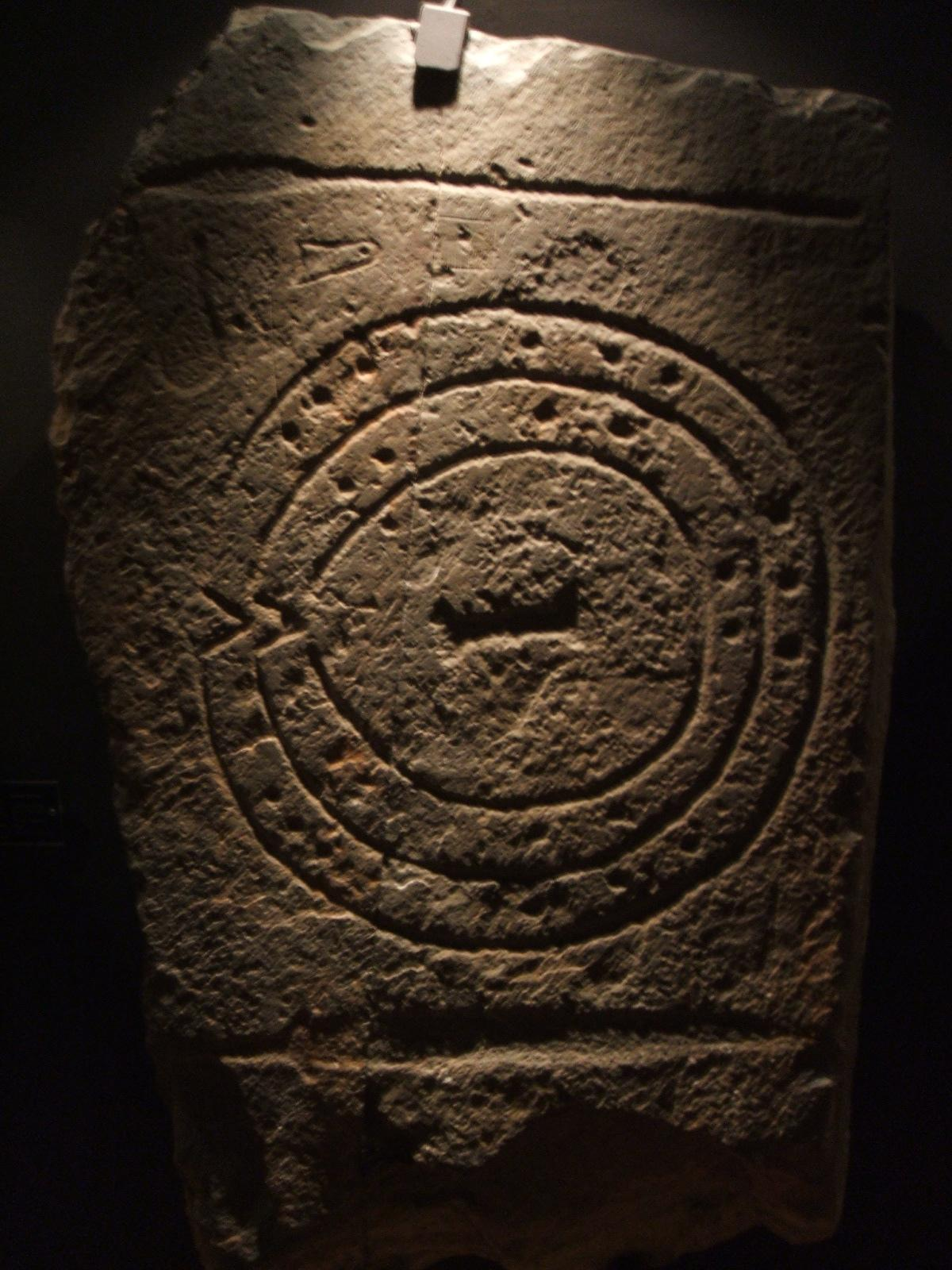
Brozas:stele, by Bronze Age.

== See also ==
- List of municipalities in Cáceres
