= Antonio J. Bermúdez =

Mexican politician

Municipal President of Juárez
- In office 1942–1945
- Preceded by: Teófilo Borunda
- Succeeded by: Arturo Chávez Amparán

Member of the Senate of the Republic for Chihuahua
- In office 1946 (never served) – 1946

Personal details
- Born: June 13, 1892 Chihuahua, Chihuahua
- Died: February 10, 1977 (aged 84) Mexico City, Mexico
- Party: PRI
- Spouse: Hilda Mascareñas

Antonio Jáquez Bermúdez (June 13, 1892 – February 10, 1977) was a Mexican businessman and politician affiliated with the Institutional Revolutionary Party (PRI).

== Life ==
Antonio Jáquez Bermúdez was born into a middle class family in Chihuahua, Chihuahua in 1892. During the Mexican Revolution, he moved to Ciudad Juárez, which had grown rapidly and gained a new strategic and economic importance during the war.

In Ciudad Juárez he attended El Colegio Palmore, a boarding school and business college that had moved to El Paso from Chihuahua City to serve the children of the exiled elite that had become concentrated in El Paso. Mingling with the sons of prominent government officials and prominent regional political and commercial figures, he developed strong connections as he established himself as a future businessman, leaving for Los Angeles for a short period in order to attend Los Angeles Business College.

Returning to Ciudad Juárez, he quickly established himself as a dominant figure in the commercial life of the city. Beginning with the financing of saloons and cabarets, by 1927 he was running a wholesale whiskey operation displaced from Kentucky due to U.S. prohibition. He soon enough had expanded to construction and amassed a veritable fortune, becoming one of the dominant actors in the city’s economy and running the Ciudad Juárez National Chamber of Commerce from 1927 to 1929, which was his first foray into public office. Marrying into the established Ciudad Juárez Mascareñas family, and buying one of the estates of the famous Terrazas family, he firmly established himself as a new central figure within the region’s business elite.

He then shifted to a focus on a political career. Prominent among city leaders and publicly successful in his management of the city's chamber of commerce, Bermúdez became mayor of Ciudad Juárez in 1942, where he distanced himself from his past dealing with vice industries and campaigned as a moralizer against transgressions towards the city’s rightful moral character, and in particular against prostitution. This successful stint as mayor was followed by an election to the position of senator from Chihuahua that was interrupted by his selection for the directorship of the state oil company Petróleos México (Pemex) between 1946 and 1958, where he presided over the modernization and vertical integration of the government’s oil industry. With Pemex he had established himself as a firm proponent of the economic nationalism of the PRI. He described the work of constructing Ciudad Pemex, a development in Tabasco oriented towards the petroleum industry as “a gigantic effort by Mexican society to overcome by technical means the wanton blind forces of nature in order to build a world capable of giving satisfaction to the highest needs of man.”

In this period he was precandidate for the PRI nomination for Presidency and afterwards he served for three years as Mexican ambassador in the Middle East, returning only in 1961 to serve in the final public position of his life, director of the National Border Program (PRONAF). Bermúdez's brainchild, PRONAF sought to remake the border cities of the country in order to display the development of Mexican economy and culture, transform the dour reputation of the region, and capture greater shares of the cross border consumer market for Mexico. This program ultimately fell far short of its original intentions but helped kickstart the industrialization of the border region. To this day, the massive Antonio J. Bermúdez Industrial Park in Ciudad Juárez bears his name.
