= Pedro de Lerma =

Spanish theologian

Pedro de Lerma (c. 1461 – August 11, 1541) was a Spanish theologian.

De Lerma was born in Burgos, in northern Spain, and studied at the University of Paris. Within the University, he first taught arts at the Collège de Navarre, then from 1500 was at the Collège de Sorbonne, and earned a doctorate in theology in 1504. In 1506 he was appointed canon in Burgos, then in 1508 became the first chancellor of the University of Alcalá. He was part of the pro-Erasmus faction at a conference in Valladolid in June through August 1527 called by the Inquisition to investigate Erasmus's writings. He resigned as chancellor of Alcalá in 1535, and returned to Burgos. In 1537 he was tried by the Inquisition himself, accused of spreading Erasmus's views, and forced to recant several points. To avoid further trouble, he moved back to Paris later that year, where he became dean of the faculty of theology at the Sorbonne, and died in 1541.
