= Pedro Fernández de Valenzuela (conquistador) =

Spanish conquistador

- Born: unknown Córdoba, Andalusia, Castile
- Died: unknown Castile
- Burial place: Church of the Hospital de San Bartolomé de las Bubas; 37°53′02″N 4°46′10″W
- Other names: Pedro Hernández de Valenzuela
- Occupations: Conquistador
- Years active: 1536-1539
- Employer: Spanish Crown
- Known for: Spanish conquest of the Muisca
- Children: Pedro Fernández de Valenzuela (son); Isabel (daughter)
- Family: Cousins: Hernán Venegas Carrillo, Juan Tafur, Martín Yañés Tafur

Pedro Fernández de Valenzuela (?, Córdoba, Andalusia - ?, Córdoba) was a Spanish conquistador who took part in the expedition of the Spanish conquest of the Muisca led by Gonzalo Jiménez de Quesada from 1536 to 1538. He was the cousin of Hernán Venegas Carrillo and after his journey in the New World returned to Córdoba. He was buried in the church of the former Hospital San Bartolomé de las Bubas in Córdoba.

== Biography ==
Pedro Fernández de Valenzuela was born in a noble family in an unknown year in Córdoba, Andalusia. He was a cousin of other conquistadors; Hernán Venegas Carrillo, Martín Yañés Tafur and Juan Tafur. Fernández de Valenzuela fought under the Spanish king Carlos II in Italy and gained the title of captain. He left for Santa Marta in the army of Pedro Fernández de Lugo and later accompanied Gonzalo Jiménez de Quesada on the journey towards the Muisca Confederation. De Quesada trusted Fernández de Valenzuela to explore the rich emerald region of Somondoco in 1537 and next year included him in the army to fight the Panche in the Battle of Tocarema. Fernández de Valenzuela accompanied De Quesada and other conquistadors on his journey back to Spain in 1539 and returned to Córdoba. He had a son and daughter; Pedro and Isabel Fernández de Valenzuela.

== See also ==
- List of conquistadors in Colombia
- Spanish conquest of the Muisca
- El Dorado
- Hernán Pérez de Quesada
- Gonzalo Jiménez de Quesada

== Bibliography ==
- Real Academia de la Historia (1992), Congreso de Historia del Descubrimiento (1492-1556): actas (ponencias y communicaciones) - Volume 3 of Actas, Real Academia de la Historia, pp. 1–681, ISBN 8460082032
- Rodríguez Freyle, Juan; Achury Valenzuela, Darío (1979) [1859 (1638)], El Carnero - Conquista i descubrimiento del nuevo reino de Granada de las Indias Occidentales del mar oceano, i fundacion de la ciudad de Santa Fe de Bogota (PDF) (in Spanish), Fundacion Biblioteca Ayacuch, pp. 1–598, archived from the original (PDF) on 2020-08-07
