= Guataquí =

Coordinates: 4°31′01″N 74°47′26″W

- Municipality and town
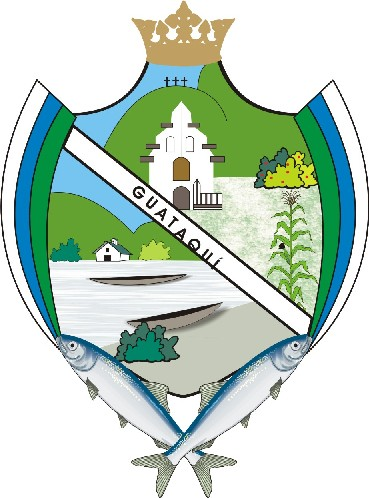
- Flag Coat of arms

- Location of the municipality and town inside Cundinamarca Department of Colombia

- Location in Colombia
- Country: Colombia
- Department: Cundinamarca

Area
  - Total: 87 km^{2} (34 sq mi)

Population (2015)
  - Total: 2,630
  - Density: 30/km^{2} (78/sq mi)
- Time zone: UTC-5 (Colombia Standard Time)

Guataquí is a municipality and town of Colombia in the department of Cundinamarca.
