= List of Aphrophoridae genera =

This is a list of genera in the family Aphrophoridae, spittlebugs.

== Aphrophoridae genera ==
- Abbalomba ^{c g}
- Abdas ^{c g}
- Ainoptyelus ^{c g}
- Amarusa ^{c g}
- Aphrophora Germar, 1821^{i c g b}
- Aphrophorias ^{c g}
- Aphropsis ^{c g}
- Ariptyelus ^{c g}
- Atuphora ^{c g}
- Avernus ^{c g}
- Awafukia ^{c g}
- Awaphora ^{c g}
- Balsana ^{c g}
- Basilioterpa ^{c g}
- Bathyllus ^{c g}
- Beesoniella ^{c g}
- Betaclovia ^{c g}
- Boniphora ^{c g}
- Byrebistus ^{c g}
- Capnodistes ^{c g}
- Carystoterpa ^{c g}
- Cephisus Stål, 1866^{i c g}
- Choua ^{c g}
- Clovia ^{c g}
- Cloviana ^{c g}
- Cnemidanomia ^{c g}
- Cordia ^{c g}
- Costaclovia Hamilton, 1981^{g}
- Daha ^{c g}
- Dasyoptera ^{c g}
- Dinda ^{c g}
- Dophora ^{c g}
- Ecothera ^{c g}
- Egretius ^{c g}
- Eguptyelus ^{c g}
- Eicissus
- Enocomia ^{c g}
- Eoptyelus ^{c g}
- Epicranion ^{c g}
- Epipyga
- Erugissa
- Escragnollia ^{c g}
- Euclovia ^{c g}
- Eulepyronia ^{c g}
- Eulepyroniella ^{c g}
- Eurycercopis ^{c g}
- Eusounama ^{c g}
- Flosshilda ^{c g}
- Formophora ^{c g}
- Fusiptyelus Hamilton, 1981^{g}
- Futaptyelus ^{c g}
- Gaeta ^{c g}
- Gallicana ^{c g}
- Grellaphia ^{c g}
- Handschinia ^{c g}
- Hemiapterus ^{c g}
- Hemipoophilus ^{c g}
- Hemitriecphora
- Hiraphora ^{c g}
- Hosophora ^{c g}
- Hymettus ^{c g}
- Interocrea ^{c g}
- Iophosa ^{c g}
- Irlandiana ^{c g}
- Iwaptyelus ^{c g}
- Izzardana ^{c g}
- Jembra ^{c g}
- Jembrana ^{c g}
- Jembroides ^{c g}
- Jembrophora ^{c g}
- Jembropsis ^{c g}
- Jophora ^{c g}
- Kageptyelus ^{c g}
- Kitaptyelus ^{c g}
- Koreptyelus ^{c g}
- Kotophora ^{c g}
- Lallemandana ^{c g}
- Lemoultana ^{c g}
- Leocomia ^{c g}
- Leocomiopsis ^{c g}
- Lepyronia Amyot & Serville, 1843^{i c g b}
- Lepyroniella ^{c g}
- Lepyronoxia ^{c g}
- Lepyropsis ^{c g}
- Liorhina ^{c g}
- Macrofukia ^{c g}
- Mandesa ^{c g}
- Maptyelus ^{c g}
- Megafukia ^{c g}
- Mesoptyelus ^{c g}
- Microsargane
- Mimoptyelus ^{c g}
- Miphora ^{c g} [invalid]
- Nagaclovia ^{c g}
- Nagafukia ^{c g}
- Nagophora ^{c g}
- Napotrephes ^{c g}
- Neoavernus ^{c g}
- Neophilaenus Haupt, 1935^{i c g b}
- Nesaphrestes ^{c g}
- Nikkofukia ^{c g}
- Nikkoptyelus ^{c g}
- Nokophora ^{c g}
- Novaphrophara ^{c g}
- Novophilaenus ^{c g}
- Nyanja ^{c g}
- Obiphora ^{c g}
- Ogaphora ^{c g}
- Oiptyelus ^{c g}
- Okiptyelus ^{c g}
- Omalophora ^{c g}
- Orthorapha ^{c g}
- Paralepyroniella ^{c g}
- Paraphilaenus Vilbaste, 1962^{i c g}
- Paraphrophora ^{c g}
- Pareurycercopis ^{c g}
- Patriziana ^{c g}
- Pentacanthoides ^{c g}
- Perinoia ^{c g}
- Petaphora ^{c g}
- Peuceptyelus ^{c g}
- Philaenarcys Hamilton, 1979^{i c g b}
- Philaenus Stål, 1864^{i c g b}
- Philagra ^{c g}
- Philagrina ^{c g}
- Philaronia Ball, 1898^{i c g b}
- Plinia ^{c g}
- Poophilus ^{c g}
- Pseudaphronella ^{c g}
- Pseudaphrophora ^{c g}
- Pseudocraniolum ^{c g}
- Ptyelinellus ^{c g}
- Ptyelus ^{c g}
- Qinophora ^{c g}
- Sabphora ^{c g}
- Sagophora ^{c g}
- Salomonia ^{c g}
- Sappoptyelus ^{c g}
- Seiphora ^{c g}
- Sepullia ^{c g}
- Sinophora ^{c g}
- Sounama ^{c g}
- Sphodroscarta ^{c g}
- Strandiana ^{c g}
- Takagia ^{c g}
- Takaphora ^{c g}
- Tamaphora ^{c g}
- Tilophora ^{c g}
- Tobiphora ^{c g}
- Todophora ^{c g}
- Tonkaephora ^{c g}
- Toroptyelus ^{c g}
- Tremapterus ^{c g}
- Trigophora ^{c g}
- Tukaphora ^{c g}
- Vervactor ^{c g}
- Witteella ^{c g}
- Xenaphrophora ^{c g}
- Yamaphora ^{c g}
- Yaphora ^{c g}
- Yezophora ^{c g}
- Yunnana ^{c g}

Data sources: i = ITIS, c = Catalogue of Life, g = GBIF, b = Bugguide.net
