= Aphrophora gelida =

Scientific classification
- Kingdom: Animalia
- Phylum: Arthropoda
- Class: Insecta
- Order: Hemiptera
- Suborder: Auchenorrhyncha
- Family: Aphrophoridae
- Genus: Aphrophora
- Species: A. gelida

Binomial name
- Aphrophora gelida (Walker, 1851)

Species of true bug

Aphrophora gelida, the boreal spittlebug, is a species of spittlebug in the family Aphrophoridae. It is found in North America.
