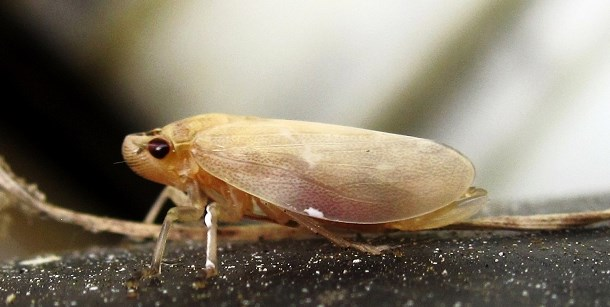

Scientific classification
- Kingdom: Animalia
- Phylum: Arthropoda
- Class: Insecta
- Order: Hemiptera
- Suborder: Auchenorrhyncha
- Family: Aphrophoridae
- Genus: Aphrophora
- Species: A. cribrata

Binomial name
- Aphrophora cribrata (Walker, 1851)

= Aphrophora cribrata =

Species of true bug

Aphrophora cribrata, the pine spittlebug, is a species of spittlebug in the family Aphrophoridae.

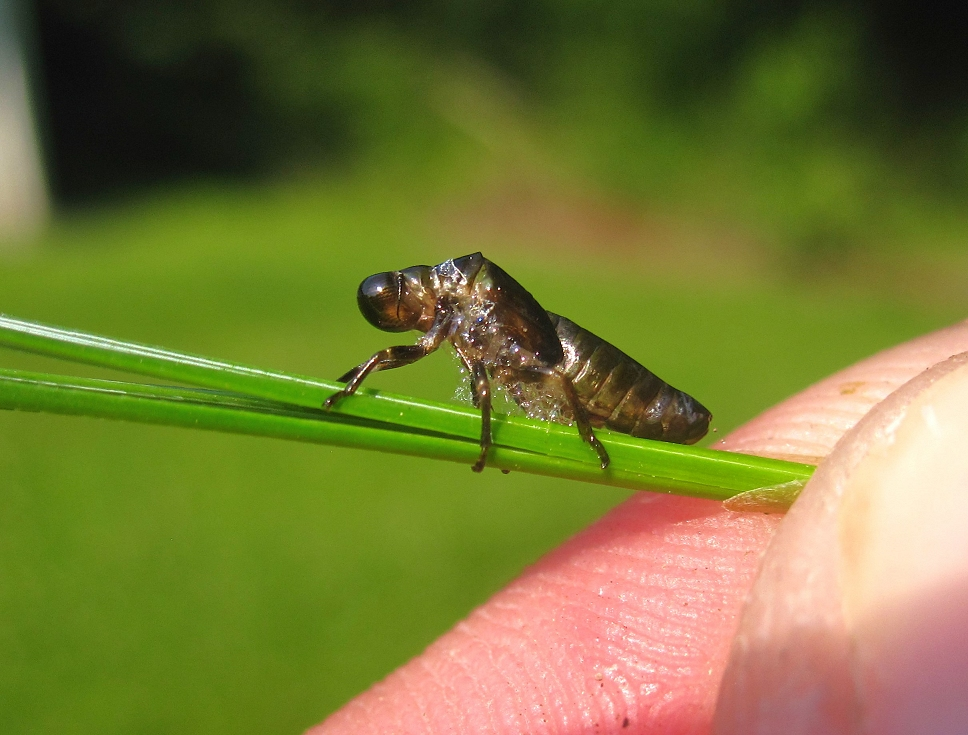
Pine spittlebug, Aphrophora cribrata
