= Weeping wattle =

Weeping wattle is a common name for several plants and may refer to:

- Acacia saligna
- Peltophorum africanum
