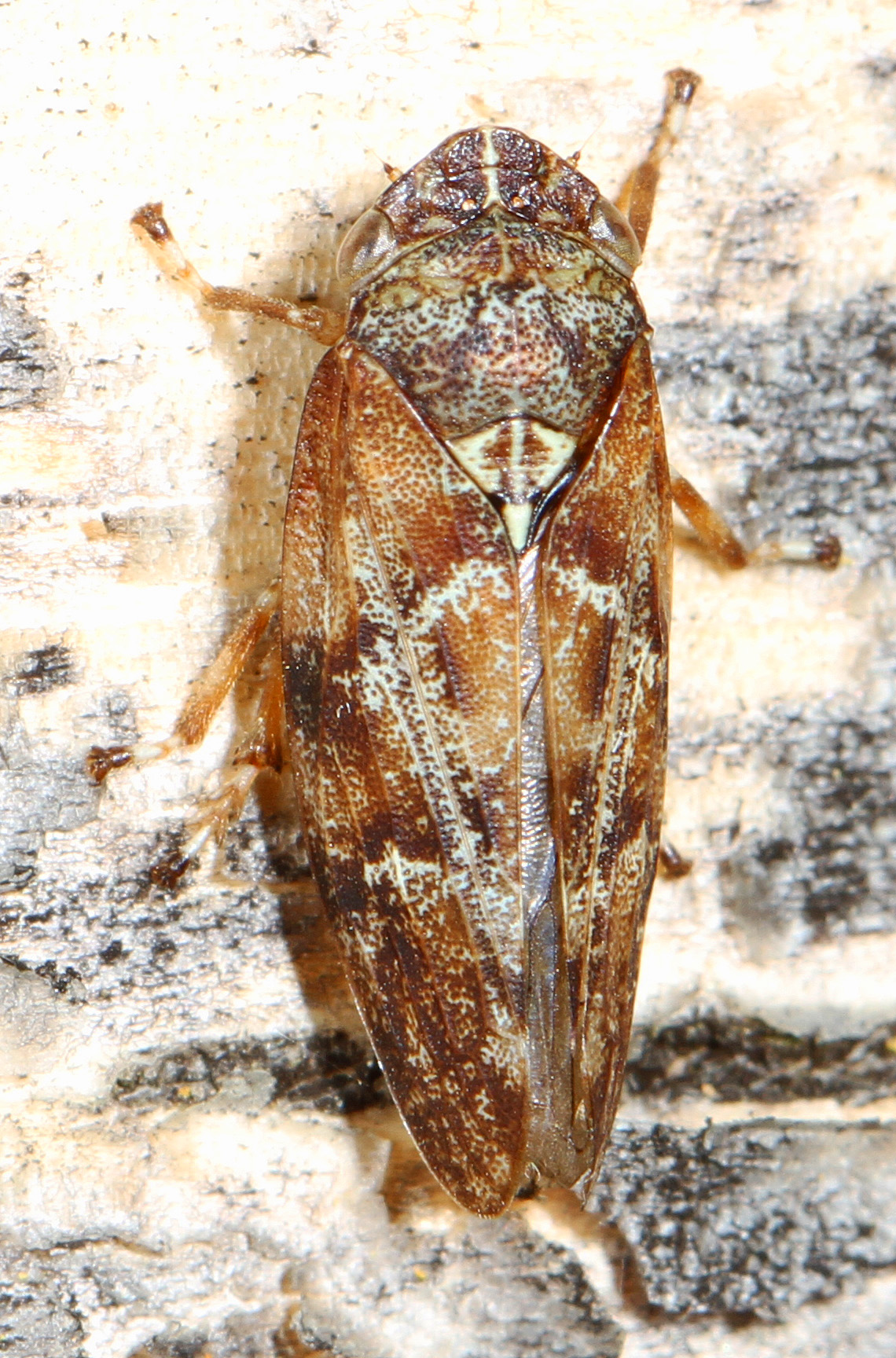

Scientific classification
- Kingdom: Animalia
- Phylum: Arthropoda
- Class: Insecta
- Order: Hemiptera
- Suborder: Auchenorrhyncha
- Family: Aphrophoridae
- Genus: Aphrophora
- Species: A. permutata

Binomial name
- Aphrophora permutata Uhler, 1875

= Aphrophora permutata =

Species of true bug

Aphrophora permutata, the douglas-fir spittlebug, is a species of spittlebug in the family Aphrophoridae. It is found in North America. It is a vector of Xylella fastidiosa, and can be found along the edges of vineyards, as well as in woodlands and riparian habitats.

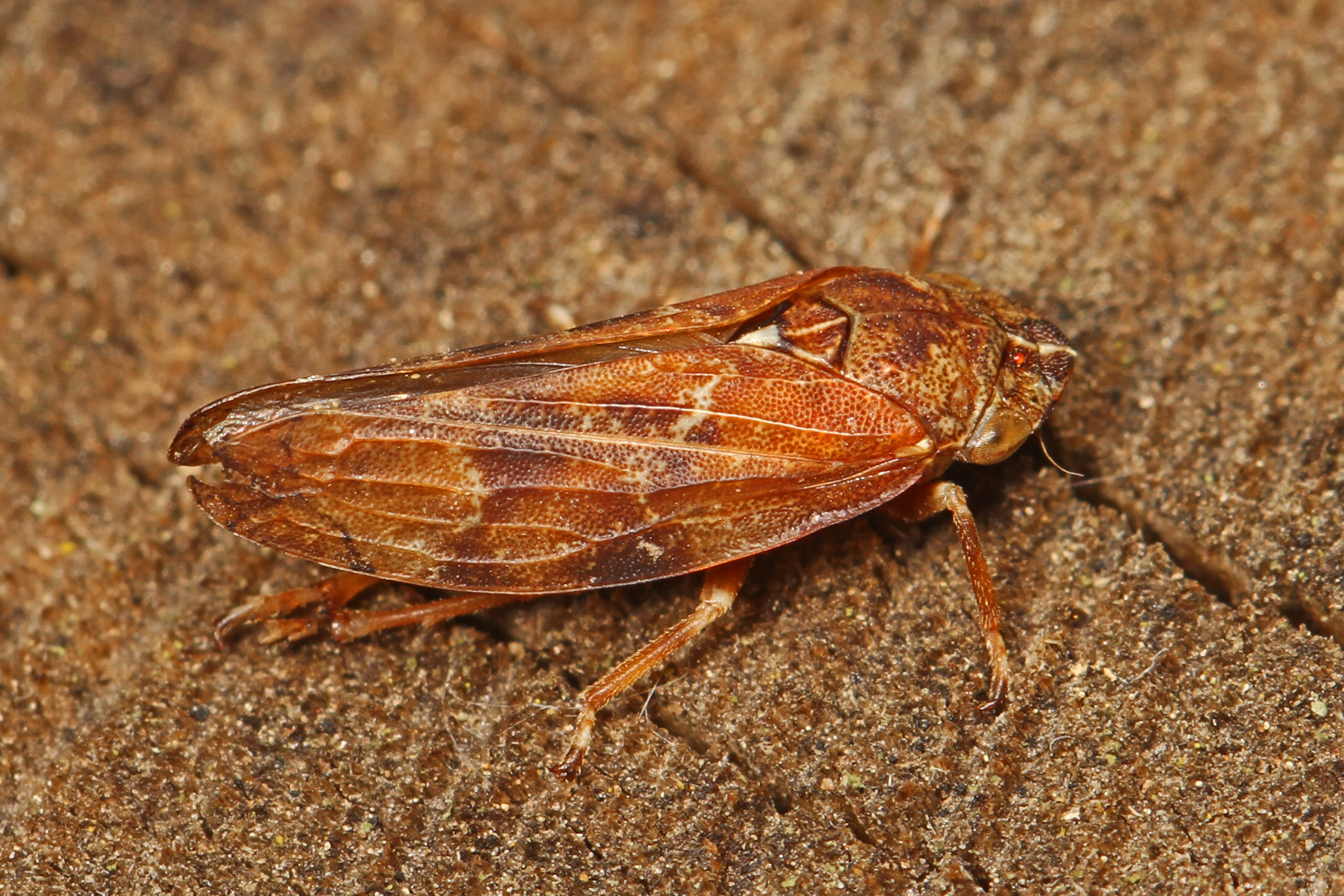
Douglas-fir spittlebug, Aphrophora permutata
