= Handschinia =

Handschinia may refer to:

- Handschinia (bug), a genus of true bugs in the family Aphrophoridae
- Handschinia Stach, 1949, a genus of springtails in the family Neanuridae, synonym of Handschinurida
- Handschinia Massoud, 1967, a genus of springtails in the family Neanuridae, synonym of Arlesia
