= Aphrophora princeps =

Scientific classification
- Domain: Eukaryota
- Kingdom: Animalia
- Phylum: Arthropoda
- Class: Insecta
- Order: Hemiptera
- Suborder: Auchenorrhyncha
- Family: Aphrophoridae
- Genus: Aphrophora
- Species: A. princeps

Binomial name
- Aphrophora princeps Walley, 1928

Species of true bug

Aphrophora princeps, the cone spittlebug, is a species of spittlebug in the family Aphrophoridae. It is found in North America.
