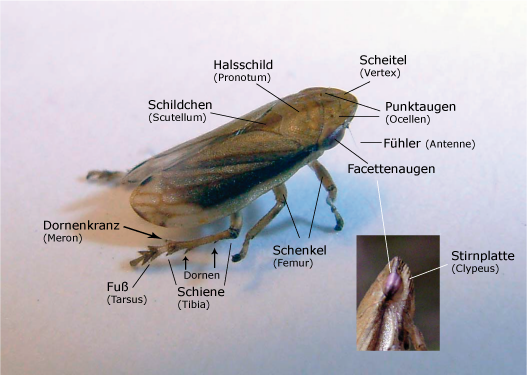

Scientific classification
- Kingdom: Animalia
- Phylum: Arthropoda
- Class: Insecta
- Order: Hemiptera
- Suborder: Auchenorrhyncha
- Family: Aphrophoridae
- Genus: Neophilaenus
- Species: N. lineatus

Binomial name
- Neophilaenus lineatus (Linnaeus, 1758)

= Neophilaenus lineatus =

Species of insect

Neophilaenus lineatus, the lined spittlebug, is a species of spittlebug in the family Aphrophoridae. It is found in Europe, northern Asia (excluding China), and North America.

Lined spittlebug, Neophilaenus lineatus

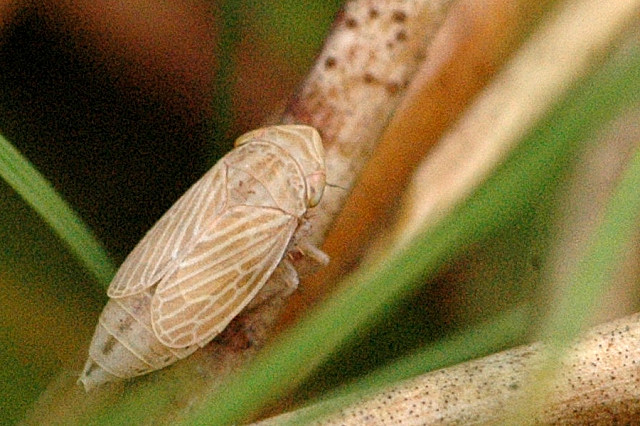
Lined spittlebug, Neophilaenus lineatus

== Subspecies ==
These two subspecies belong to the species Neophilaenus lineatus:

- Neophilaenus lineatus aterrimus (Sahlberg, 1871)^{c g}
- Neophilaenus lineatus lineatus^{g}

Data sources: i = ITIS, c = Catalogue of Life, g = GBIF, b = Bugguide.net
