= Philaenarcys bilineata =

Scientific classification
- Domain: Eukaryota
- Kingdom: Animalia
- Phylum: Arthropoda
- Class: Insecta
- Order: Hemiptera
- Suborder: Auchenorrhyncha
- Family: Aphrophoridae
- Genus: Philaenarcys
- Species: P. bilineata

Binomial name
- Philaenarcys bilineata (Say, 1831)

Species of true bug

Philaenarcys bilineata, the prairie spittlebug, is a species of spittlebug in the family Aphrophoridae. It is found in North America. Habitats it can be found in include prairies and boreal forests.
