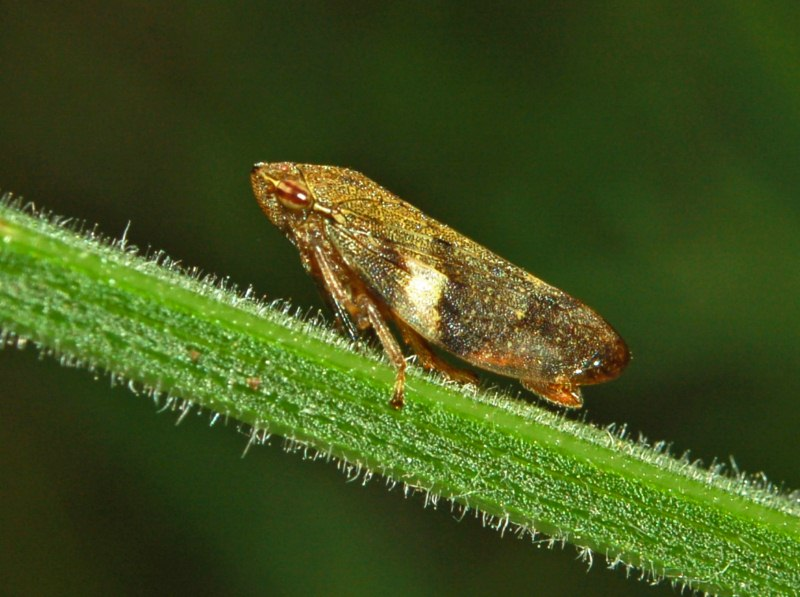
- Aphrophora alni, side view

Scientific classification
- Kingdom: Animalia
- Phylum: Arthropoda
- Clade: Pancrustacea
- Class: Insecta
- Order: Hemiptera
- Suborder: Auchenorrhyncha
- Family: Aphrophoridae
- Genus: Aphrophora
- Species: A. alni

Binomial name
- Aphrophora alni (Fallén, 1805)

Synonyms
- Cercopis alni Fallén, 1805

= Aphrophora alni =

Species of true bug

Aphrophora alni, the European alder spittle bug, is a species belonging to the family Aphrophoridae.

== Distribution ==
This species is quite common and widespread. It is present in most of Europe, in the eastern Palearctic realm, in the Near East, and in North Africa. It is naturalized in North America.

== Habitat ==
These 'froghoppers' inhabit dry and moist habitats of lowlands and mountainous areas, forest edges, hedgerows, meadows, gardens and parks, from the lowlands up to mountains at an elevation up to 1,500 metres (4,900 ft) above sea level.

== Description ==
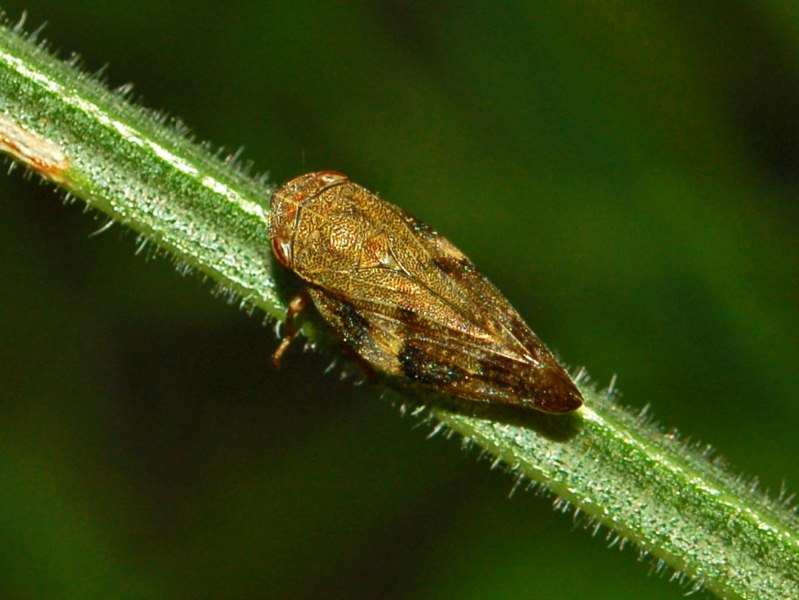
Aphrophora alni, dorsal view

The adults of these large 'froghoppers' reach 9–10 millimetres (0.35–0.39 in) of length, the females are usually slightly larger than the males. The basic coloration of the body is usually brown. Their front wings wear two distinct clear patches on the margins. Head and pronotum have a median keel. The head has a pair of compound eyes and two simple eyes (ocelli). The legs are strongly developed and fit to jump. Tibiae of the rear pair of legs carry several spines.

== Biology ==
They can be encountered from May through October on bushes and on several species of trees, especially willows (Salix species), birch (Betula species), alder (Alnus species) and poplar (Populus species). Aphrophora alni is a polyphagous species, meaning it feeds on several kind of plants. The adults primarily feed on deciduous trees, while larvae prefer herbaceous plants (dicotyledonous).

To lay eggs, the females migrate to the herb layers. The eggs overwinter and hatch the larvae in the following spring. The larvae live in stems and leaves of herbaceous plants inside the typical foam nest, that protects them against enemies and provide necessary moisture and temperature for their development. Aphrophora alni has only one generation a year.

== Gallery ==
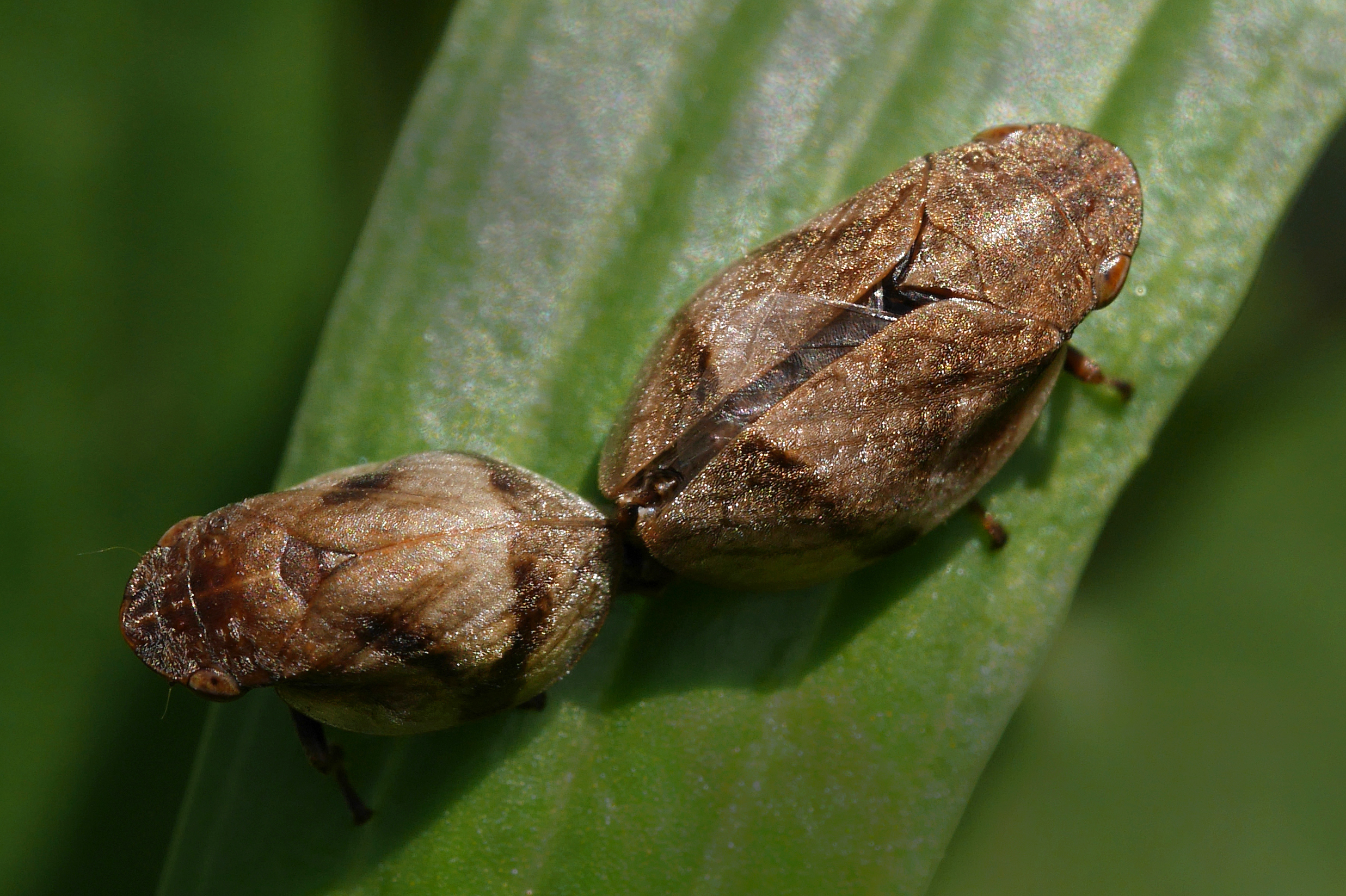
Mating

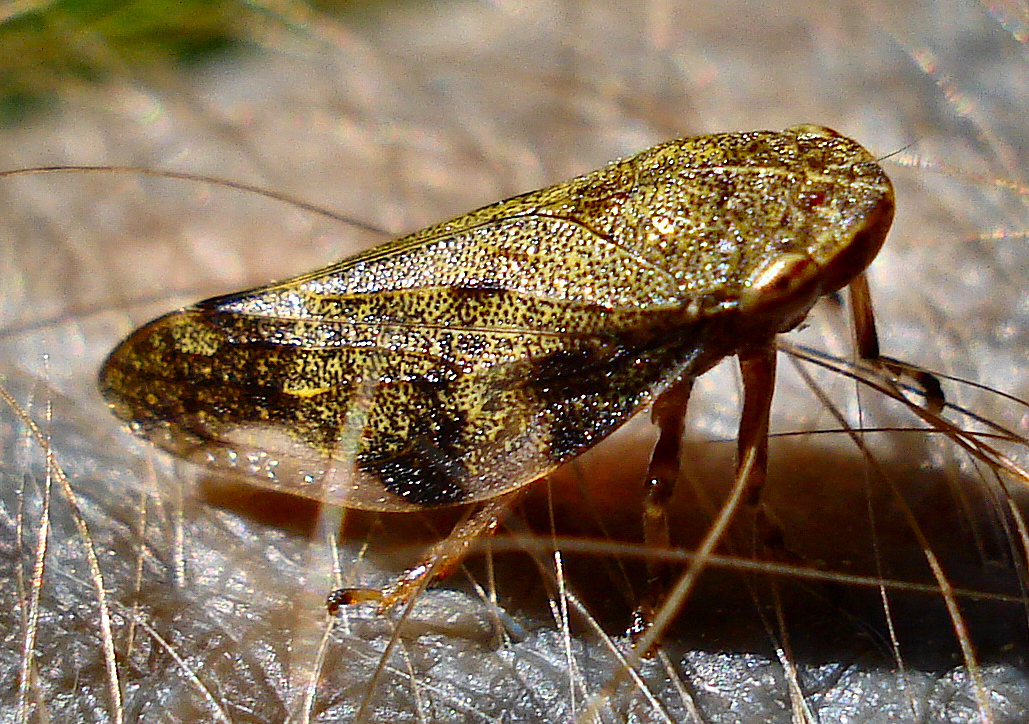

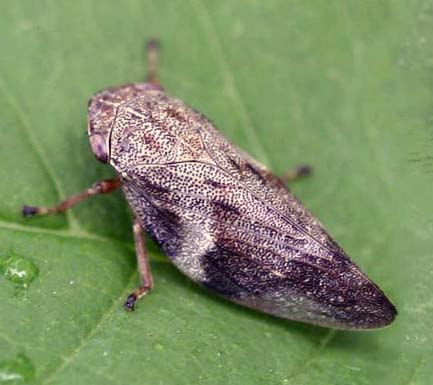

Clip
