= Salomonia =

Salomonia may refer to:

- Salomonia (bug), a genus of insects in the family Aphrophoridae
- Salomonia (plant), a genus of plants in the family Polygalaceae
- Salomonia, a genus of plants in the family Asparagaceae; synonym of Polygonatum
