= Philaronia canadensis =

Scientific classification
- Domain: Eukaryota
- Kingdom: Animalia
- Phylum: Arthropoda
- Class: Insecta
- Order: Hemiptera
- Suborder: Auchenorrhyncha
- Family: Aphrophoridae
- Genus: Philaronia
- Species: P. canadensis

Binomial name
- Philaronia canadensis (Walley, 1929)

Species of true bug

Philaronia canadensis is a species of spittlebug in the family Aphrophoridae.
