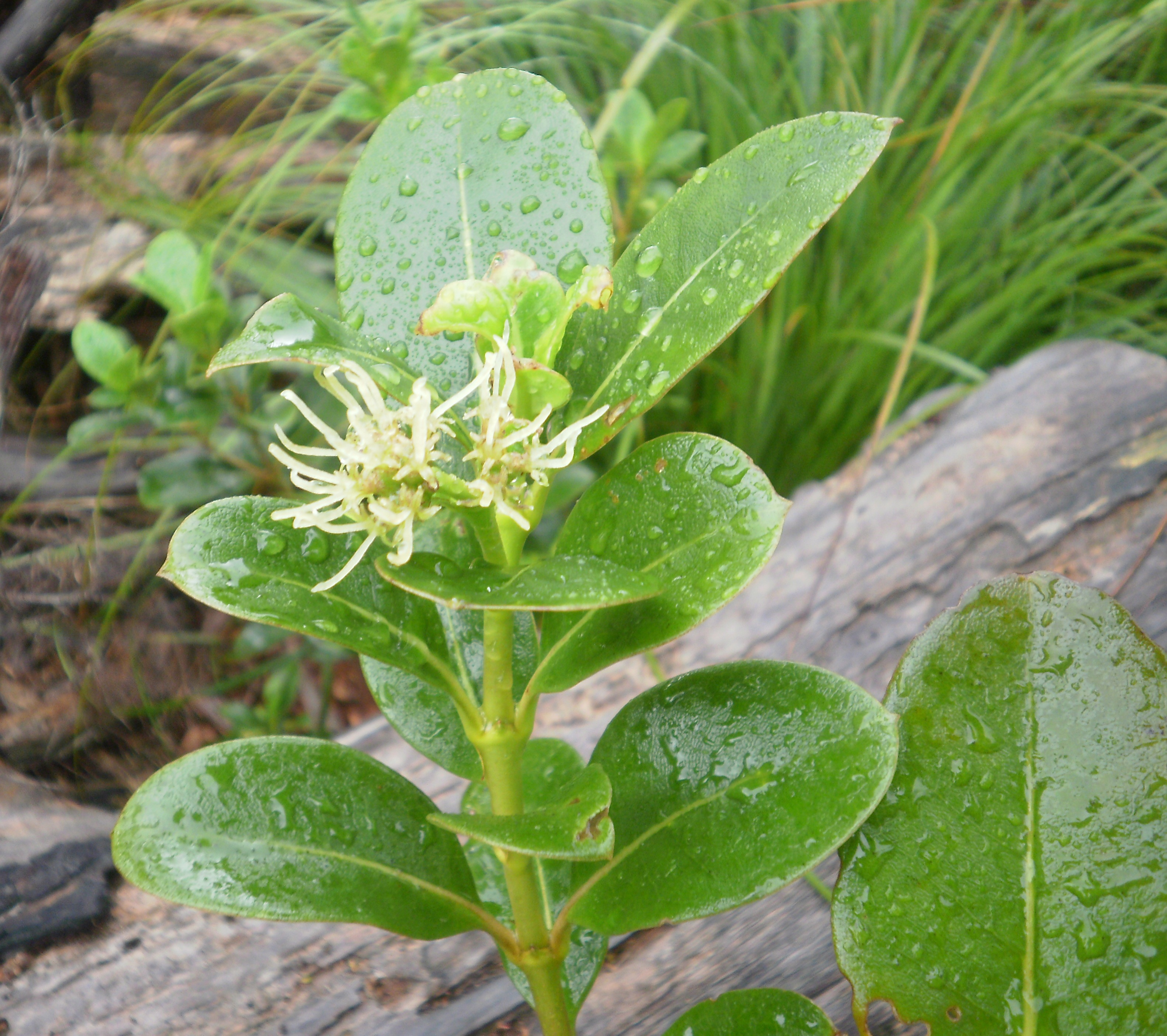

Scientific classification
- Kingdom: Plantae
- Clade: Tracheophytes
- Clade: Angiosperms
- Clade: Eudicots
- Clade: Asterids
- Order: Gentianales
- Family: Rubiaceae
- Genus: Coprosma
- Species: C. lucida

Binomial name
- Coprosma lucida J.R.Forst. & G.Forst. 1776

Synonyms
- Coprosma australis

= Coprosma lucida =

Species of plant

Coprosma lucida, commonly known as shining karamū, karamū, kāramuramu, shiny karamū, or kakaramu, is a shrub or tree endemic to New Zealand.

== Species description ==
Coprosma lucida is a plant that is typically found in the form of a shrub or tree. This plant reaches a maximum height between 5 and 6 metres.

This species of Coprosma is a large-leaved species compared with other Coprosmas. The leaves are dark green on the upper surface and a paler green underneath, with a leaf margin that sometimes undulates. The leaves of C. lucida are typically between 12 and 17 cm long. The typical width of C. lucida leaves at their widest point is 3–5 cm. The leaves are elliptical in shape, with a decreasing width at the tip of the leaf and where the leaf meets the petiole. The petiole of a plant connects the leaf to the stem. For C. lucida, the petiole is typically 1–3 cm long, with a short, triangular stipule between opposite petioles. This triangular green stipule is green, which differs from the black tip on the stipule of the otherwise similar-looking and often co-occurring Coprosma robusta. On the leaves of C. lucida, the midrib is very prominent and can be felt protruding from the upper and lower surfaces of the leaf (unlike Coprosma robusta, which has an indented midrib on its upper surface).

The underside of C. lucida leaves typically has domatia. Domatia are large follicles on the leaf surface that provide shelter for mites to live on the leaf and protect the leaf from invading pests and diseases. The domatia on C. lucida can be found in the junctions between the secondary veins and the midrib.

The roots and inner bark of C. lucida are a yellow colour, rather than dull brown like the similar C. robusta. Additionally, unlike C. robusta and some other Coprosma species, C. lucida does not have a foul-smelling odour. The yellow colouration of C. lucida bark is caused by the presence of anthraquinones in the bark; anthraquinones are molecules that provide a yellow dying quality to the tissue. The branches of C. lucida are short and thick, with younger branches having a greener structure and older branches turning brown with the development of bark.

Typically, C. lucida is dioecious. This means that plants of this species are either male or female and produce either pollen or seeds. However, some cases of monoecy have been observed in C. lucida, where individual plants were noted to have both male and female reproductive structures. The flowers that are produced by C. lucida are present on panicles extending from the leaf axils of older branches. The leaf axils are the locations where the petioles of the leaves meet the branches of the plant. The flowers of C. lucida are white or green in colouration.

C. lucida produces small clusters of oblong fruit that are yellow-orange to orange. Each fruit has two seeds surrounded by an endocarp and a juicy pericarp. At the point where the peduncle meets the fruit, the peduncle widens slightly. A peduncle is a specialised stem that holds the fruit to the branch of the tree.

== Range ==
=== Natural range ===
C. lucida is endemic to New Zealand.

=== New Zealand range ===
C. lucida is a plant that lives in warm, temperate regions. Within New Zealand, C. lucida is typically found in low coastal and montane forests. C. lucida is found throughout both mainland islands of New Zealand and some smaller surrounding islands, extending as far south as Big South Cape Island. The latitudinal range of C. lucida in New Zealand is between 34.42°S and 46.75°S. However, C. lucida is rare on Stewart Island, where deer populations have drastically reduced the population. Smale et al. also noted that C. lucida can be found growing in geothermal soils of the Taupō Volcanic Zone.

== Habitat ==
C. lucida is an understory plant. C. lucida can also be found in forest gaps, at forest margins, and in regenerating forest sites. As an understory or sub-canopy plant, C. lucida is often associated with kauri forests. Additionally, C. lucida has been noted as an epiphyte, including as an epiphyte on tree ferns. After disturbance events, C. lucida is an early successional plant. Furthermore, C. lucida can be consistently found growing in geothermal zones. Due to the preference of C. lucida for coastal and montane habitats, the plant is present at altitudes ranging from sea level to 1130 metres.

== Ecology ==
=== Life cycle/phenology ===
C. lucida is a fast-growing and short-lived shrub. Once the plant has reached maturity, C. lucida has flowers and fruit for extended portions of the year. The flowers appear during the spring season, the fruit begins to develop during the next winter, and fruit is not fully ripened until the following autumn. This means that the fruiting season from one year often overlaps with the fruiting season of the next, leading to plants that produce fruits of two different growth stages at one time. Overall, the fruit of this plant takes about 17 months to develop after the flower is fertilised. The seeds of C. lucida are then dispersed through birds.

=== Growing Conditions ===
When growing in geothermal areas, C. lucida is found in soils at the cooler end of the soil temperature gradient. In addition, C. lucida has a tolerance to shade. This means that C. lucida can grow in some areas where denser canopies prevent light from penetrating to the forest floor. The frost resistance of C. lucida is between -7 °C and -8 °C, and the plant has a hardiness zone rating of 8.

=== Predators, parasites, and diseases ===
The foliage of C. lucida is a food source for the introduced species of white-tailed deer and brush-tailed possums. Alternatively, the plant's vessels are a target for the xylem-feeding spittlebug Carystoterpa fingens, to which C. lucida is one of many host plants. Deer have been observed gnawing on the bark of the shrub as well. Finally, birds consume the fruit of C. lucida since birds are the primary dispersal agent of the seeds.

== Cultural uses ==
C. lucida had multiple uses for the indigenous people of New Zealand. The bark of C. lucida trees forms an anthraquinone molecule called lucidin that can be used as a dye pigment. The size of C. lucida fruit was used by the indigenous Māori to assess forest health from year to year.
