= Philaronia abjecta =

Scientific classification
- Domain: Eukaryota
- Kingdom: Animalia
- Phylum: Arthropoda
- Class: Insecta
- Order: Hemiptera
- Suborder: Auchenorrhyncha
- Family: Aphrophoridae
- Genus: Philaronia
- Species: P. abjecta

Binomial name
- Philaronia abjecta (Uhler, 1876)

Synonyms
- Philaenus abjectus Uhler, 1876

Species of true bug

Philaronia abjecta is a species of spittlebug in the family Aphrophoridae. It is found in Central America and North America.
