= Aphrophora saratogensis =

Scientific classification
- Domain: Eukaryota
- Kingdom: Animalia
- Phylum: Arthropoda
- Class: Insecta
- Order: Hemiptera
- Suborder: Auchenorrhyncha
- Family: Aphrophoridae
- Genus: Aphrophora
- Species: A. saratogensis

Binomial name
- Aphrophora saratogensis (Fitch, 1851)

Species of true bug

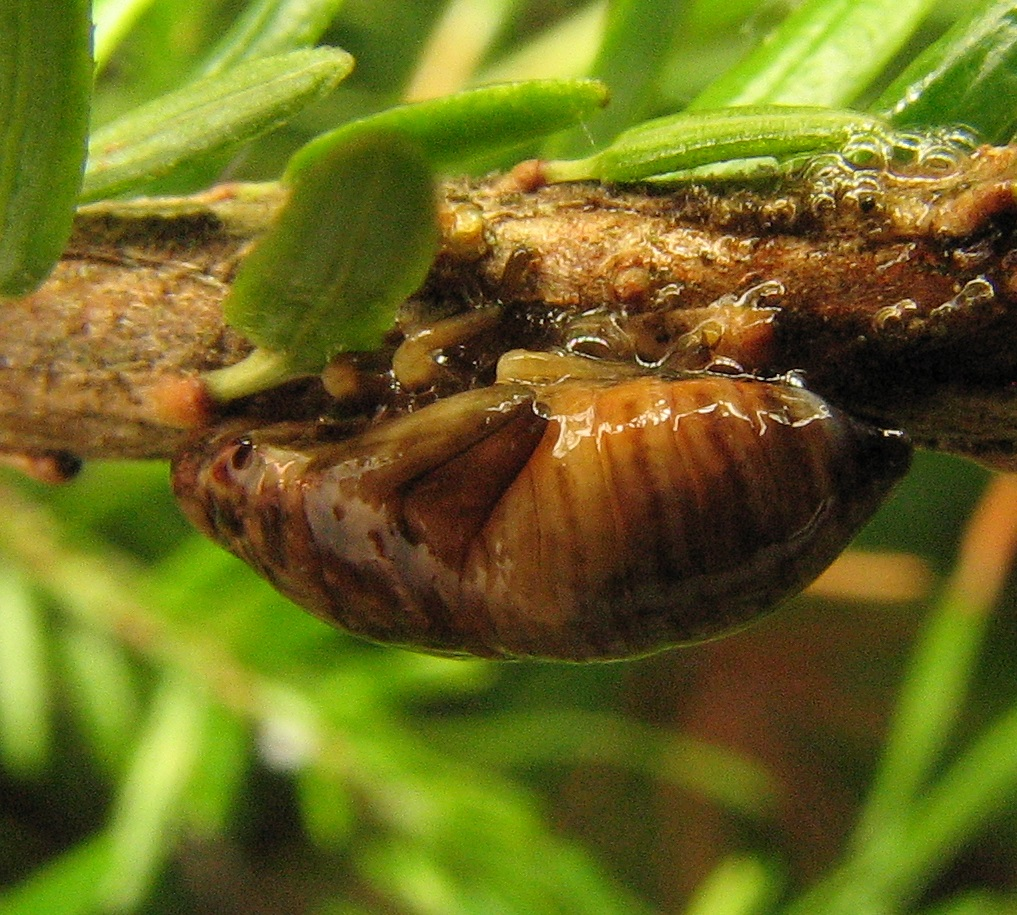
Aphrophora nymph, probably Aphrophora saratogensis on hemlock

Aphrophora saratogensis, the Saratoga spittlebug, is a species of spittlebug in the family Aphrophoridae. It is found in North America.
