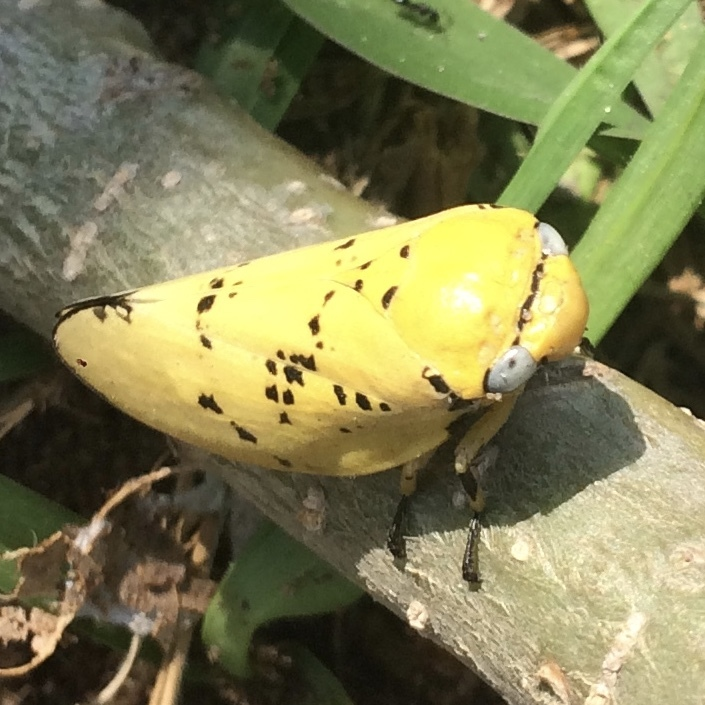
- Ptyelus flavescens

Scientific classification
- Kingdom: Animalia
- Phylum: Arthropoda
- Class: Insecta
- Order: Hemiptera
- Suborder: Auchenorrhyncha
- Family: Aphrophoridae
- Subfamily: Aphrophorinae
- Tribe: Ptyelini
- Genus: Ptyelus; Le Peletier & Serville, 1825

= Ptyelus =

Genus of insects

Ptyelus is a genus of true bugs belonging to the family Aphrophoridae.

The species of this genus are found in Europe, Africa and Southeastern Asia.

== Species ==
Species:

- Ptyelus aethiops Jacobi, 1904
- Ptyelus assiniensis Lallemand, 1920
- Ptyelus caffer Stål, 1854
- †Ptyelus carbonarius Germar & Berendt, 1856
- Ptyelus cinereus Distant, 1916
- Ptyelus combinatus Distant, 1908
- Ptyelus declaratus Melichar, 1903
- Ptyelus delegorguei Spinola, 1850
- Ptyelus discifer Walker, 1851
- Ptyelus escalerai Distant, 1908
- Ptyelus flavescens (Fabricius, 1794)
- Ptyelus goudoti (Bennett, 1833)
- Ptyelus grossus (Fabricius, 1781)
- Ptyelus hambantotensis Distant, 1916
- Ptyelus hirsutus (Kirby, 1891)
- Ptyelus hottentoti (Cogan, 1916)
- Ptyelus immaculatus Schouteden, 1901
- Ptyelus inermis Montrouzier, 1861
- Ptyelus integratus Walker, 1858
- Ptyelus irroratus (Spinola, 1850)
- Ptyelus iturianus Lallemand, 1939
- Ptyelus linnei Stål, 1855
- †Ptyelus marcatus Théobald, 1937
- Ptyelus mispachathus Lucas, 1849
- Ptyelus nebula (Turton, 1802)
- Ptyelus niveus Distant, 1908
- Ptyelus obtusus Walker, 1851
- Ptyelus olivaceus (Fabricius, 1794)
- Ptyelus pectoralis Walker, 1869
- Ptyelus perroti Lallemand, 1920
- Ptyelus porrigens Walker, 1858
- Ptyelus quadrimaculatus (Spinola, 1850)
- Ptyelus rhoonensis Distant, 1920
- Ptyelus schmidti Metcalf, 1962
- Ptyelus sexvittatus Walker, 1851
- Ptyelus speciosus Lallemand, 1927
- †Ptyelus spumifer (Heer, 1853)
- Ptyelus subfasciatus Walker, 1851
- Ptyelus tamahonis Matsumura, 1940
- Ptyelus transfasciatus Lallemand, 1927
- Ptyelus velghei Lallemand, 1912
- Ptyelus vittatus Kato, 1933
