= Eulepyroniella =

Scientific classification
- Kingdom: Animalia
- Phylum: Arthropoda
- Class: Insecta
- Order: Hemiptera
- Suborder: Auchenorrhyncha
- Family: Aphrophoridae
- Genus: Eulepyroniella; Schmidt, 1925

Genus of insects

Eulepyroniella is a genus of true bugs belonging to the family Aphrophoridae.

== Species ==
Species:

- Eulepyroniella apicata (Schmidt, 1924)
- Eulepyroniella camerunensis (Schmidt, 1924)
- Eulepyroniella fasciata (Distant, 1908)
