= Cordia (insect) =

Scientific classification
- Kingdom: Animalia
- Phylum: Arthropoda
- Clade: Pancrustacea
- Class: Insecta
- Order: Hemiptera
- Suborder: Auchenorrhyncha
- Family: Aphrophoridae
- Subfamily: Aphrophorinae
- Tribe: Ptyelini
- Genus: Cordia; Stål, 1866

Genus of true bugs

Cordia is a genus of spittlebugs belonging to the family Aphrophoridae.

== Species ==
Species within this genus include:

- Cordia albilatera Walker, 1851
- Cordia minuta Synave, 1954
- Cordia peragrans Stål, 1855
- Cordia rotundiceps Lallemand, 1927
