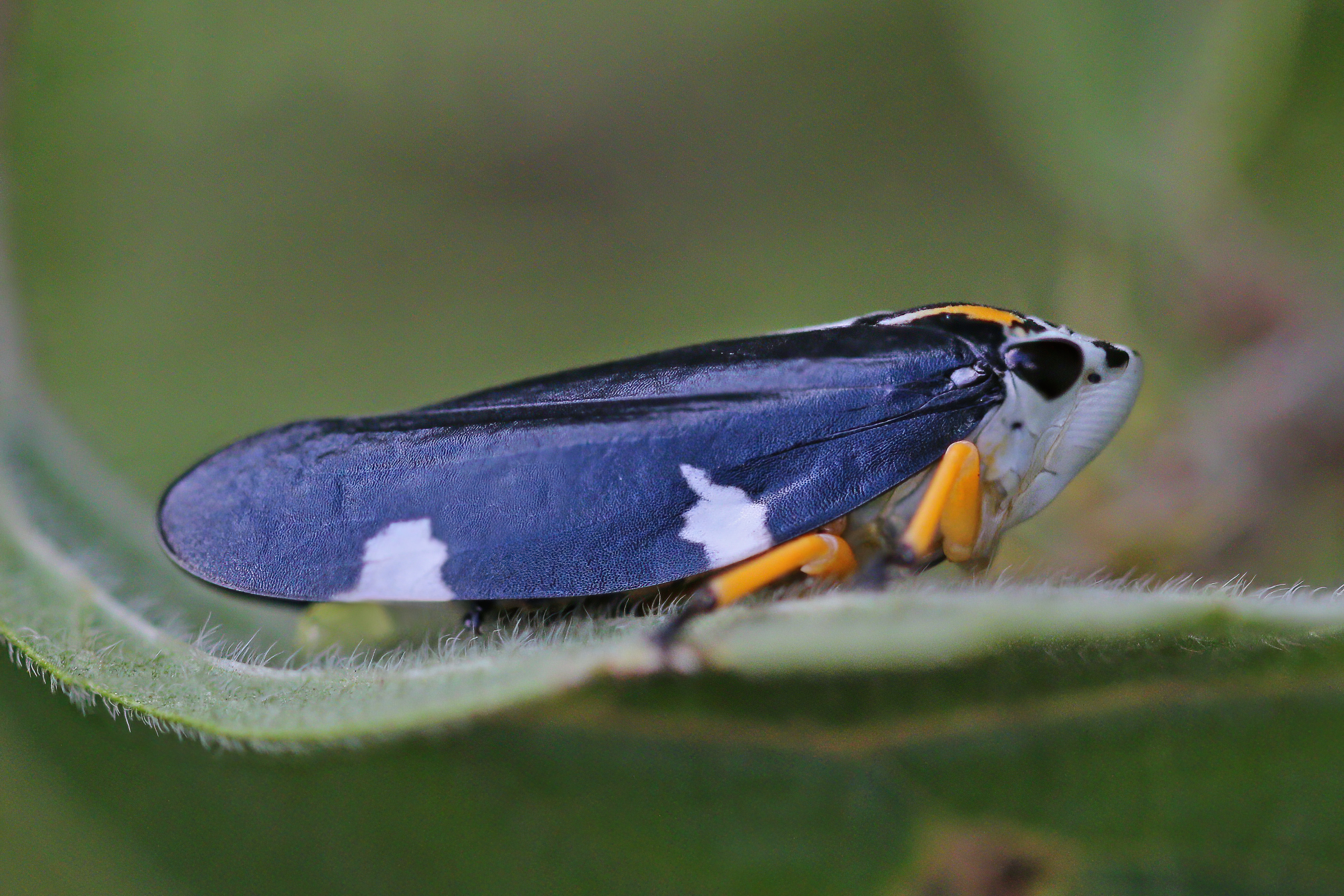

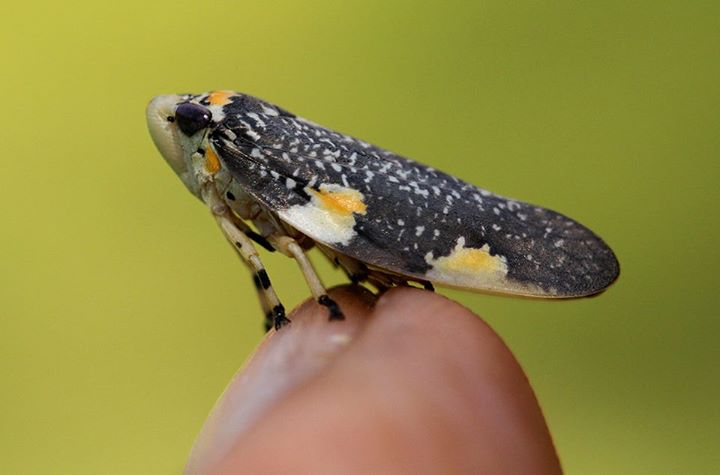

Scientific classification
- Kingdom: Animalia
- Phylum: Arthropoda
- Class: Insecta
- Order: Hemiptera
- Suborder: Auchenorrhyncha
- Family: Aphrophoridae
- Genus: Ptyelus
- Species: P. grossus

Binomial name
- Ptyelus grossus (Fabricius, 1781)

= Ptyelus grossus =

Species of true bug

Ptyelus grossus is an Auchenorrhynchan spittlebug in the family Aphrophoridae. Occurring from Southern Africa through to West Africa, the species is gregarious in its larval and nymph stages, feeding on a variety of plants, and producing protective shelters of acrid foam from their host plant's sap. Excreted in large quantities, the foam drips incessantly causing wet patches on the soil below.

Adults have slate-grey wings, each wing with two white and yellow patches near the outer margin. The head is white, rounded with large dark eyes and small black and yellow marks on the forehead.

Favoured trees are Tipuana, Peltophorum and Lonchocarpus, although its catholic diet includes species of Grevillea, Rhus, Acacia, Vangueria and even Eucalyptus.

Nymphs are preyed upon by the gorytine wasp Gorytes natalensis, the drosophilid fly Leucophenga and other carnivorous insects.

== Gallery ==
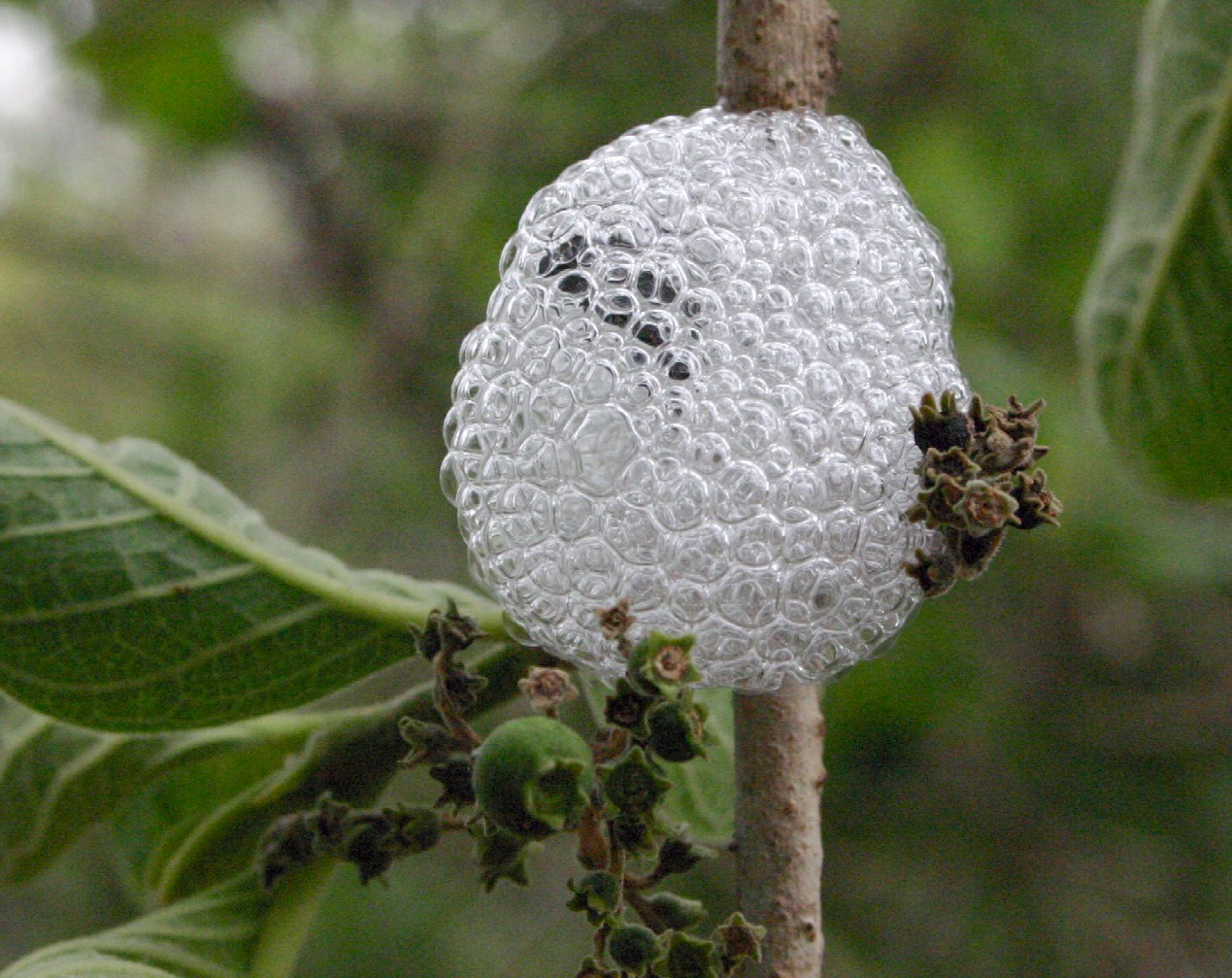
Foam nest

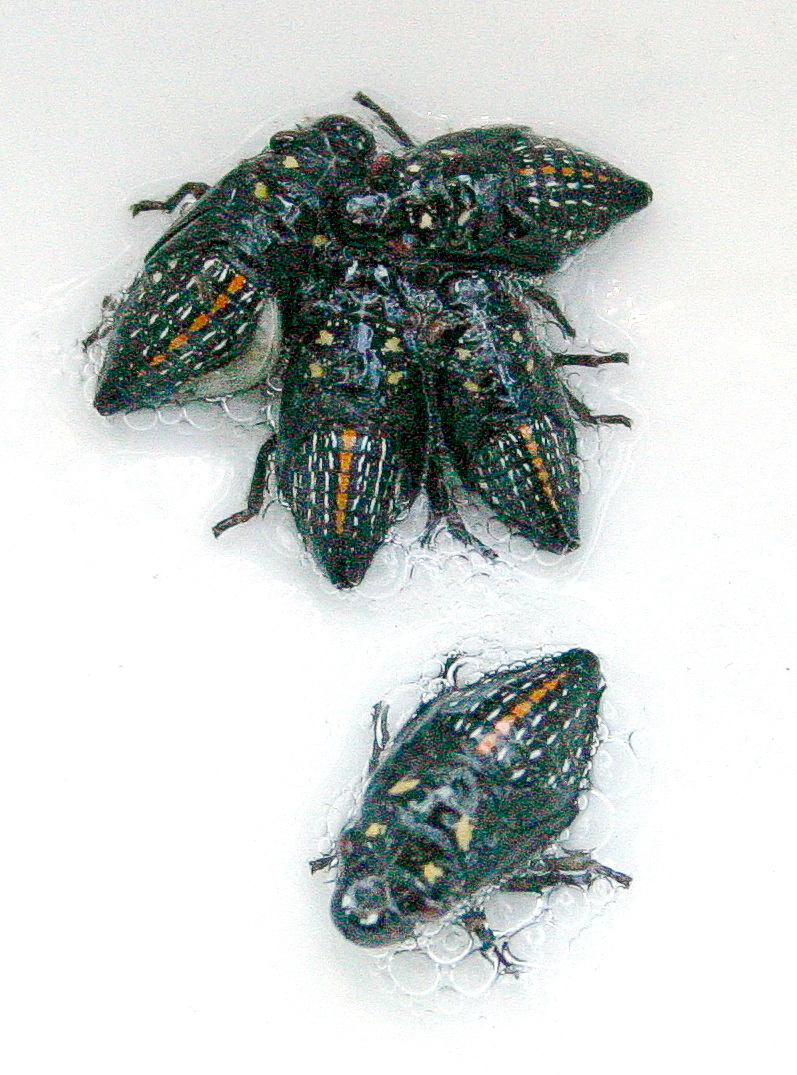
Nymphs
