= Philaronia =

Scientific classification
- Domain: Eukaryota
- Kingdom: Animalia
- Phylum: Arthropoda
- Class: Insecta
- Order: Hemiptera
- Suborder: Auchenorrhyncha
- Family: Aphrophoridae
- Genus: Philaronia; Ball, 1898

Genus of true bugs

Philaronia is a genus of spittlebugs in the family Aphrophoridae. There are about five described species in Philaronia.

== Species ==
These five species belong to the genus Philaronia:

- Philaronia abjecta (Uhler, 1876)
- Philaronia canadensis (Walley, 1929)
- Philaronia fuscovaria (Stål, 1864)
- Philaronia pauca Hamilton, 1979
- Philaronia superba Hamilton, 1979
