= Takagia =

Scientific classification
- Domain: Eukaryota
- Kingdom: Animalia
- Phylum: Arthropoda
- Class: Insecta
- Order: Hemiptera
- Suborder: Auchenorrhyncha
- Family: Aphrophoridae
- Genus: Takagia; Tang, 1984

Genus of insects

Takagia is a genus of true bugs belonging to the family Aphrophoridae.

== Species ==
The species of this genus are found in Japan.

Species:

- Takagia lugubris (Lethierry, 1876)
