= Philaenarcys =

Scientific classification
- Domain: Eukaryota
- Kingdom: Animalia
- Phylum: Arthropoda
- Class: Insecta
- Order: Hemiptera
- Suborder: Auchenorrhyncha
- Family: Aphrophoridae
- Genus: Philaenarcys; Hamilton, 1979

Genus of true bugs

Philaenarcys is a genus of spittlebugs in the family Aphrophoridae. There are at least three described species in Philaenarcys.

== Species ==
These three species belong to the genus Philaenarcys:

- Philaenarcys bilineata (Say, 1831) (prairie spittlebug)
- Philaenarcys killa Hamilton, 1979
- Philaenarcys spartina Hamilton, 1979
