= Miphora =

Scientific classification
- Kingdom: Animalia
- Phylum: Arthropoda
- Clade: Pancrustacea
- Class: Insecta
- Order: Hemiptera
- Suborder: Auchenorrhyncha
- Family: Aphrophoridae
- Genus: Miphora; Matsumura, 1940

Genus of insects

Miphora is an invalid genus of true bugs in the family Aphrophoridae.

It is considered a subjective synonym of the genus Aphrophora Germar, 1821, according to Liang, 1998: 241.

== Species ==
Several species were previously included, which now belong in other genera:

- Miphora arisanella Matsumura, 1940 -> Aphrophora (Aphrophora) arisanella (Matsumura, 1940)
- Miphora shirakii Matsumura, 1942 -> Aphrophora (Aphrophora) arisanella (Matsumura, 1940) as subjective synonym.
- Miphora taiwana (Kato, 1933) -> Aphrophora (Aphrophora) taiwana Kato, 1933
