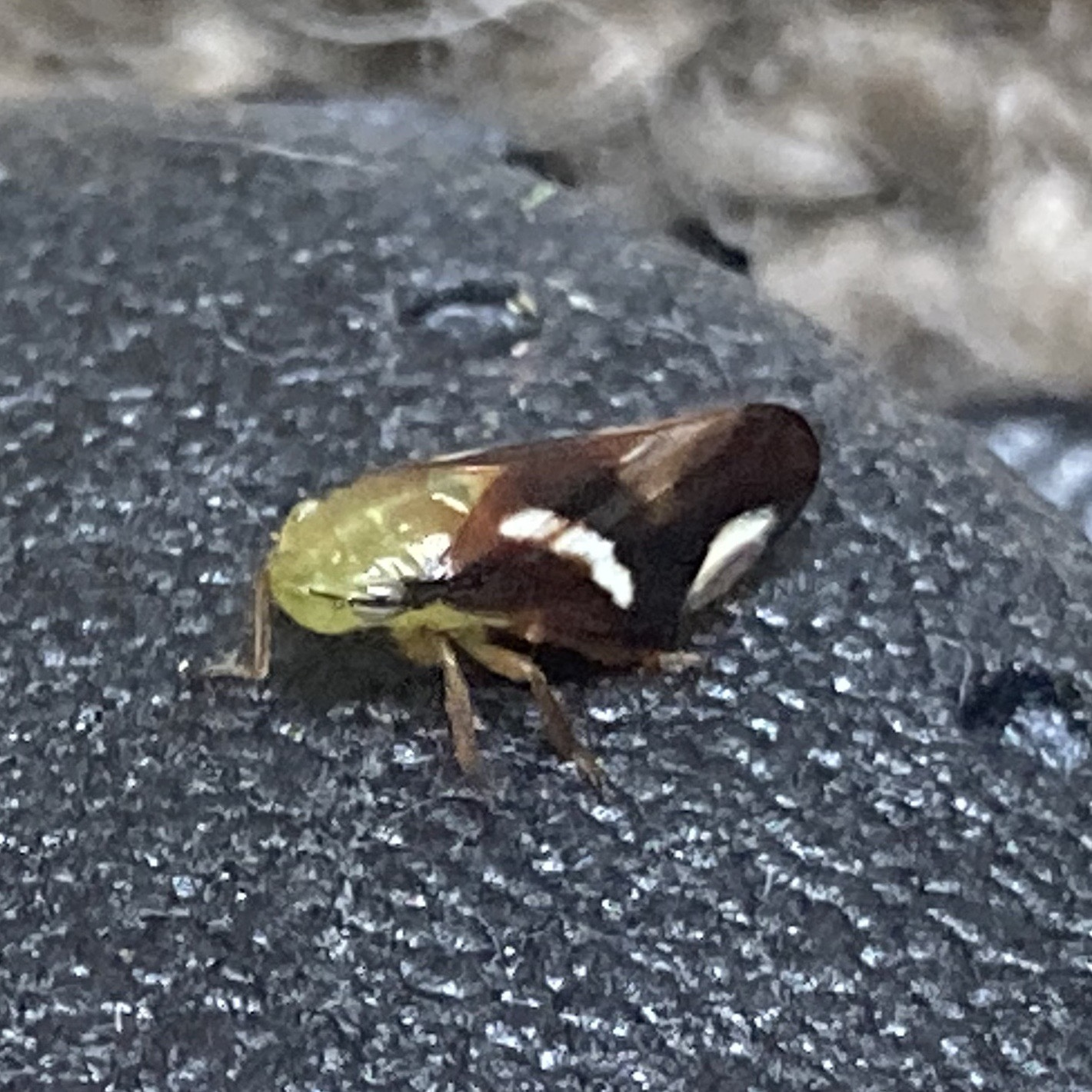

Scientific classification
- Kingdom: Animalia
- Phylum: Arthropoda
- Clade: Pancrustacea
- Class: Insecta
- Order: Hemiptera
- Suborder: Auchenorrhyncha
- Family: Aphrophoridae
- Genus: Carystoterpa
- Species: C. fingens

Binomial name
- Carystoterpa fingens (Walker, 1851)

Synonyms
- Ptyelus fingens Walker, 1851

= Carystoterpa fingens =

Species of true bug

Carystoterpa fingens, commonly known as the variegated spittlebug, is a spittlebug of the family Aphrophoridae. It is endemic to New Zealand.

== Taxonomy ==
C. fingens was first described by Francis Walker in 1851 using a specimen collected by William Colenso and was originally named Ptyelus fingens. In 1966 John William Evans placed this species in the genus Carystoterpa. The lectotype specimen, assumed to have been collected in the Auckland vicinity by Colenso, is held at the Natural History Museum, London.

== Description ==
Walker originally described this species as follows:

Yellow, shining: head and chest flat: head concave along the hind border, more convex in front where it has a slight notch on each side; its length less than half its breadth; face convex, almost oval, with a punctured middle stripe, on each side of which are nine shallow oblique cross ridges; epistoma slightly keeled : mouth tawny, reaching to the middle hips; maxillae ferruginous; chest punctured, slightly impressed across in front, with a pitchy stripe extending on each side from the eye to the base of the forewing; abdomen tawny; tips of the feet pitchy : fore-wings whitish, pale tawny towards the hind border, with an undulating ferruginous stripe, which extends through the disk from the base to the tip; hind-wings colourless; veins pale yellow. Length of the body 2 lines; of the wings 6 lines.

C. fingens is very variable in appearance.

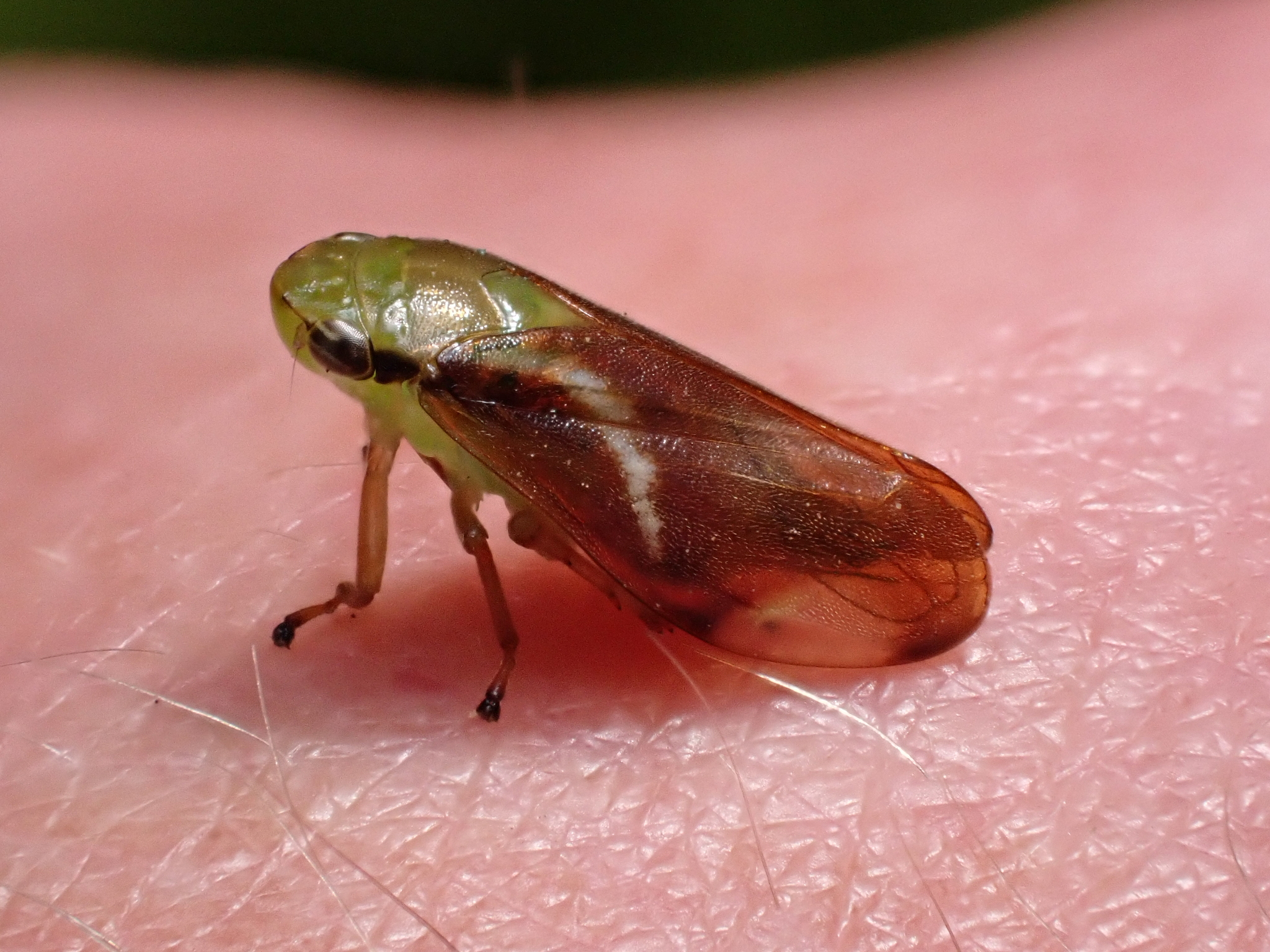
Carystoterpa fingens observed in New Plymouth, New Zealand in 2023

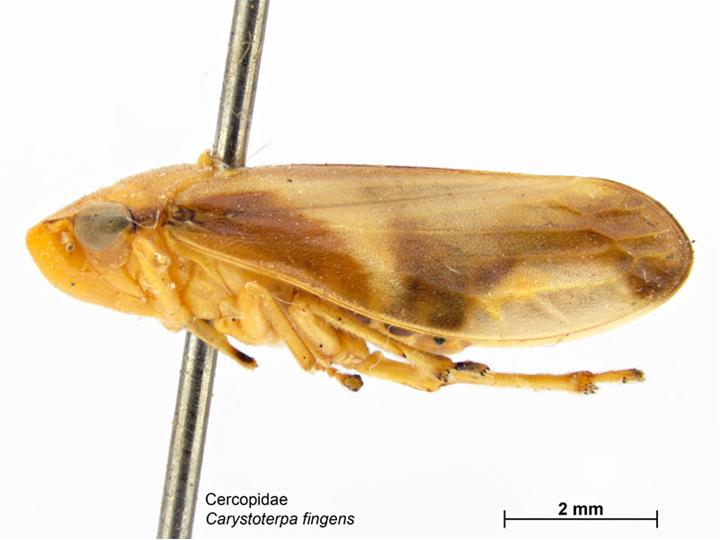
A specimen of Carystoterpa finges from the MAF Plant Health & Environment Laboratory, New Zealand

== Distribution ==
C. fingens is endemic to New Zealand. The species has been observed in the North, South and Stewart Islands as well as many of the off shore islands of New Zealand.

== Habitat ==
This species tends to inhabit coastal localities.

== Hosts ==
The adults of this species feed on a variety of plant species including species in the genus Hieracium and grape leaves (Vitis vinifera Sauvignon blanc). Individuals of C. fingens fed on all four potential host plants studied in a controlled experiment, including Hebe pubescens, Arthropodium cirratum, Dietes bicolor and Brassica oleracea.

== Human interactions ==
C. fingens is regarded by New Zealand's Ministry of Primary Industries as a likely vector of Xylella, a serious bacterial disease that is fatal to grape vines.
