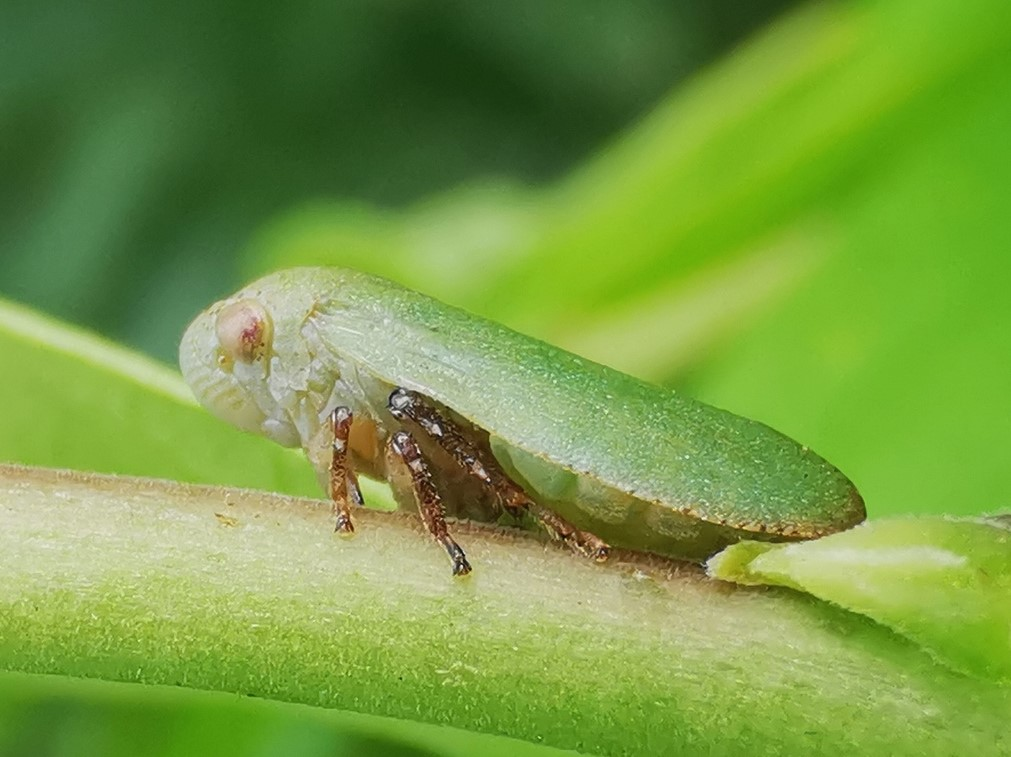

Scientific classification
- Domain: Eukaryota
- Kingdom: Animalia
- Phylum: Arthropoda
- Class: Insecta
- Order: Hemiptera
- Suborder: Auchenorrhyncha
- Family: Aphrophoridae
- Genus: Beesoniella; Lallemand, 1933

= Beesoniella =

Genus of insects

Beesoniella is a genus of true bugs belonging to the family Aphrophoridae.

== Species ==
Species:

- Beesoniella sylvestris Lallemand, 1933
