= Epipyginae =

Scientific classification
- Domain: Eukaryota
- Kingdom: Animalia
- Phylum: Arthropoda
- Class: Insecta
- Order: Hemiptera
- Suborder: Auchenorrhyncha
- Family: Aphrophoridae
- Subfamily: Epipyginae; Hamilton, 2001

Subfamily of true bugs

Epipyginae is a lineage of froghoppers in the insect family Aphrophoridae. There are at least three genera and about five described species in Epipyginae, found in the American tropics. In addition, there are more than 20 undescribed species in the group.

== Taxonomy ==
All molecular analyses published since 2005 indicate that the group is monophyletic, but is clearly nested within the family Aphrophoridae and is probably best relegated to the status of a subfamily or tribe, rather than retained as a separate family, in order to keep Aphrophoridae as a monophyletic family.

== Genera ==
- Eicissus Fowler, 1897
- Epipyga Hamilton, 2001
- Erugissa Hamilton, 2001
