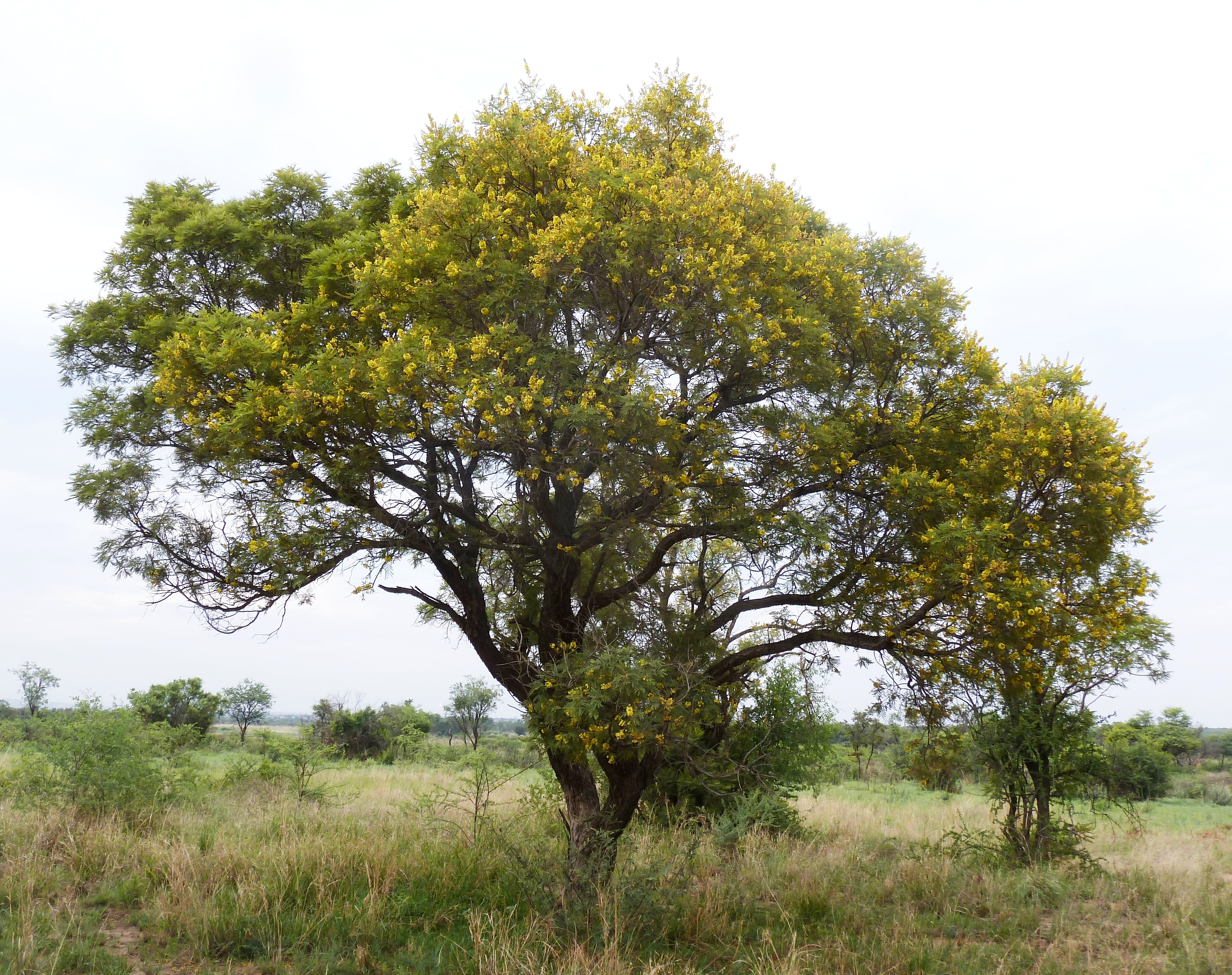

Scientific classification
- Kingdom: Plantae
- Clade: Tracheophytes
- Clade: Angiosperms
- Clade: Eudicots
- Clade: Rosids
- Order: Fabales
- Family: Fabaceae
- Subfamily: Caesalpinioideae
- Genus: Peltophorum
- Species: P. africanum

Binomial name
- Peltophorum africanum Sond.

= Peltophorum africanum =

Species of legume

Peltophorum africanum, the weeping wattle, is a semi-deciduous to deciduous flowering tree growing to about 15 meters tall. It is native to Africa south of the equator. Their yellow flowers bloom on the ends of branches in upright, showy sprays.

During spring time it may happen that water drips from the tree's branches, a phenomenon that is caused by the spittlebug Ptyelus grossus. The immature stages of these spittlebugs congregate on the young shoots and derive their nourishment by sucking the tree's sap. While doing so they secrete pure water, which is the cause of the "weeping" effect.

== Common names ==
Other common names include Rhodesian blackwood, African blackwood, Mosetlha, African wattle, African false wattle, Rhodesian wattle and Rhodesian black wattle. It is called Huilboom (i.e. weeping tree) in Afrikaans, due to the effects of the spittlebug.

== Gallery ==
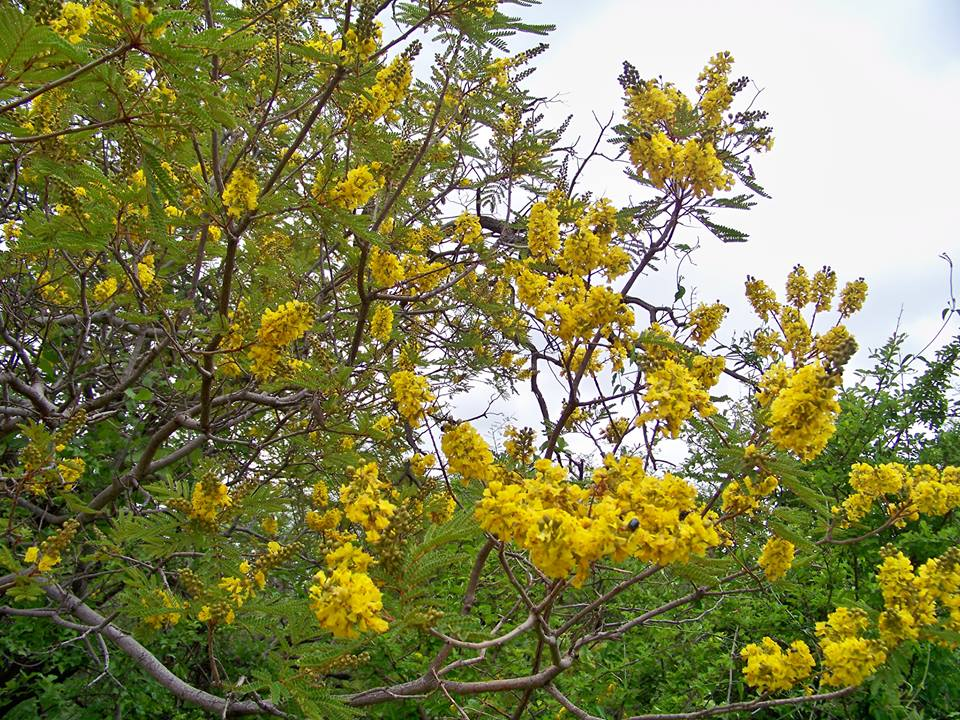
Flowers

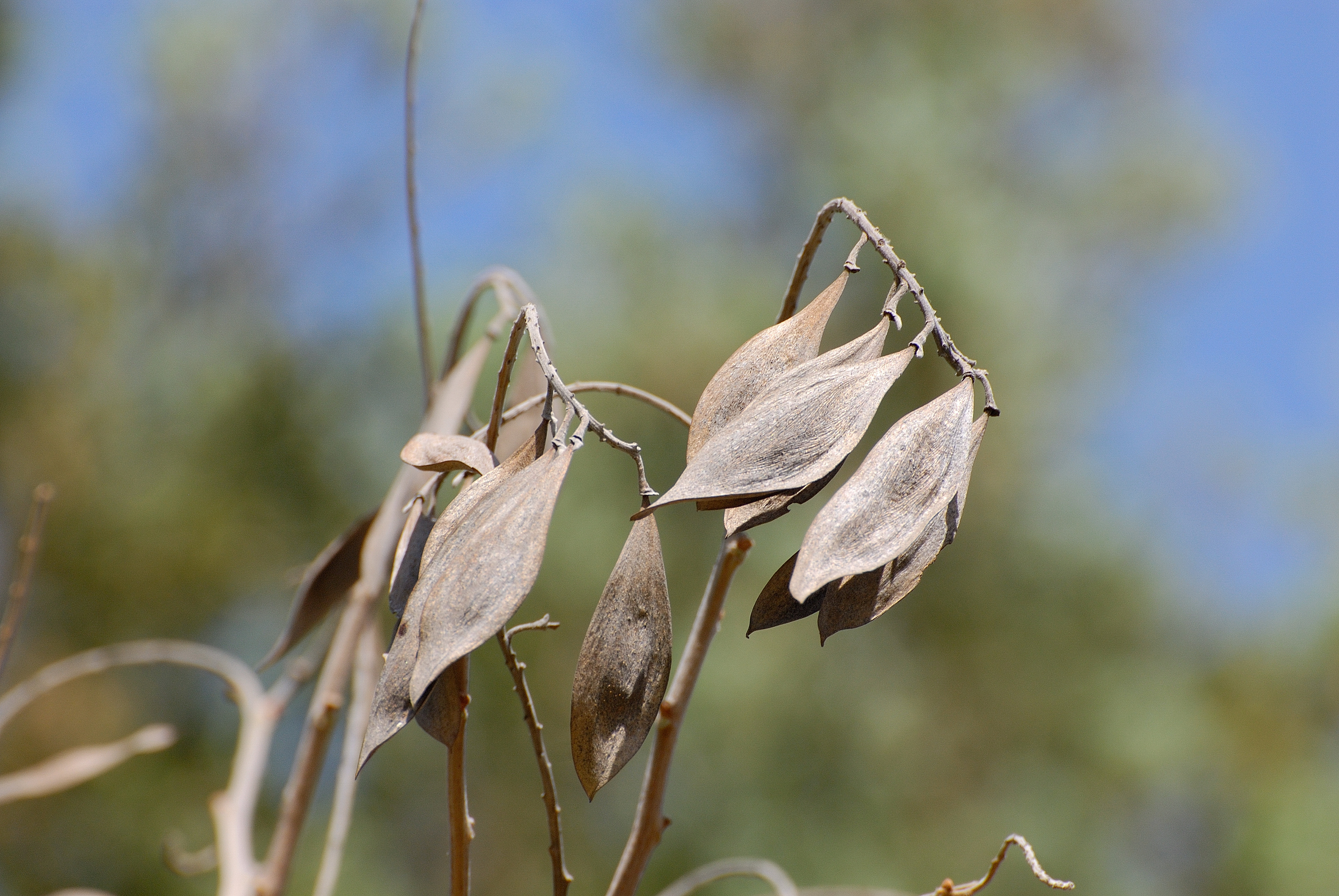
Seed pods

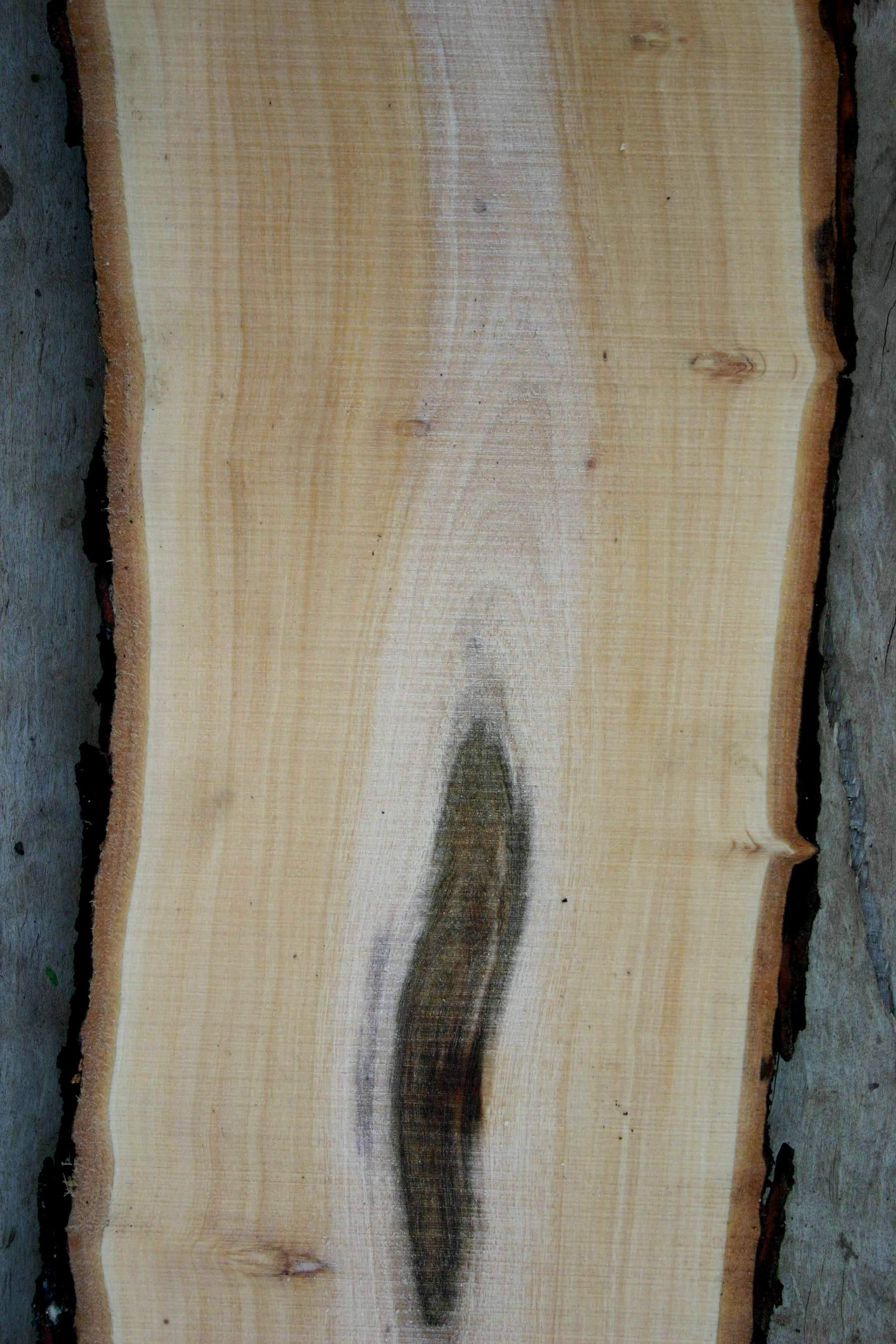
Wood

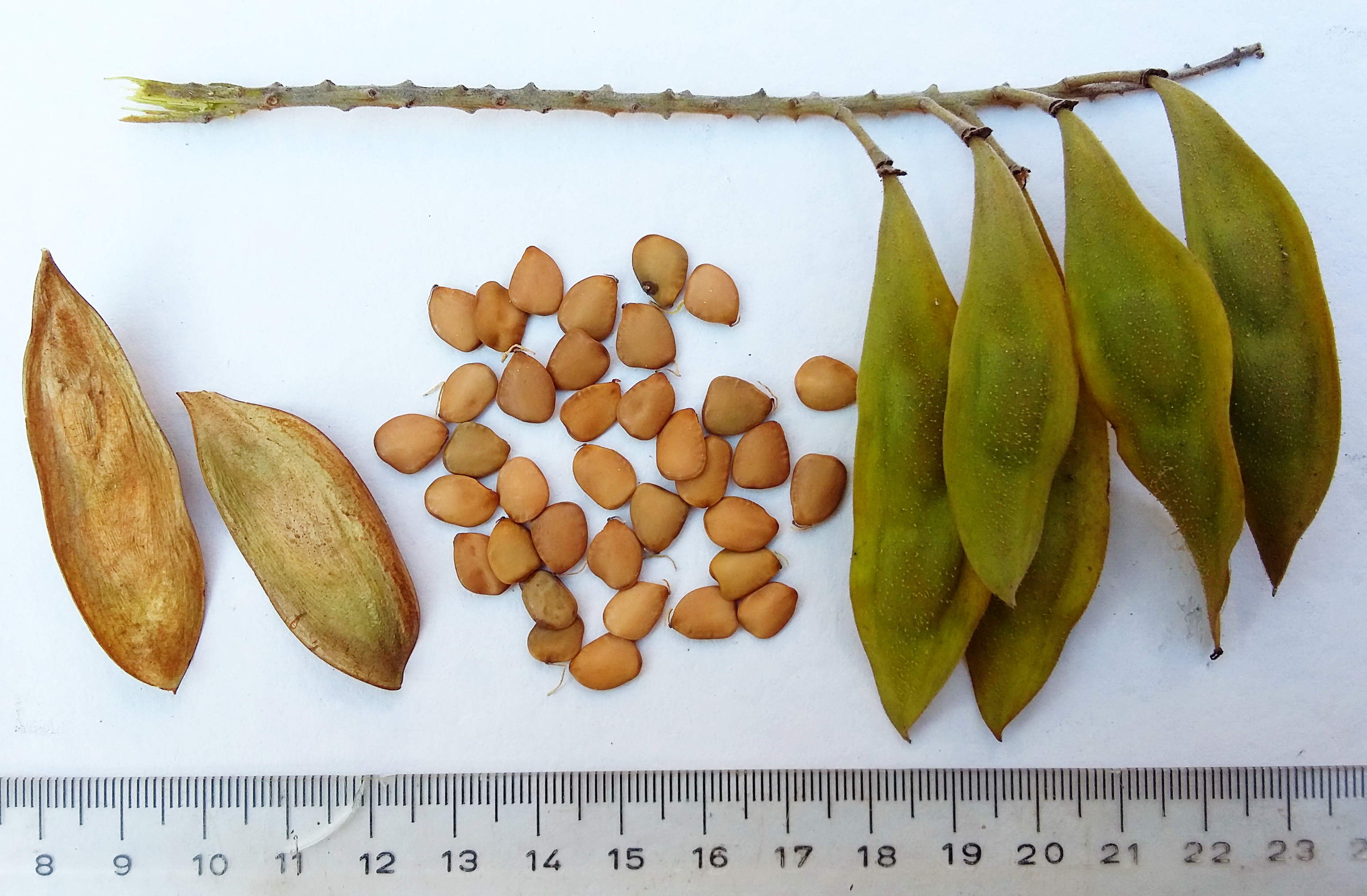
Pods, seeds, immature pods
