= Lepyroniella =

Scientific classification
- Domain: Eukaryota
- Kingdom: Animalia
- Phylum: Arthropoda
- Class: Insecta
- Order: Hemiptera
- Suborder: Auchenorrhyncha
- Family: Aphrophoridae
- Genus: Lepyroniella; Melichar, 1913

Genus of insects

Lepyroniella is a genus of true bugs belonging to the family Aphrophoridae.

The species of this genus are found on the coasts of Black Sea.

== Species ==
- Lepyroniella petrovi (Grigoriev, 1910)
