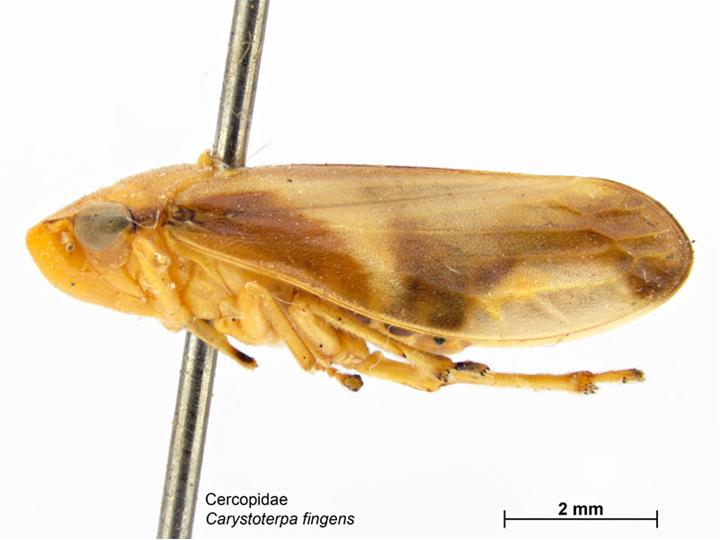
- Lateral view of Carystoterpa fingens adult

Scientific classification
- Kingdom: Animalia
- Phylum: Arthropoda
- Clade: Pancrustacea
- Class: Insecta
- Order: Hemiptera
- Suborder: Auchenorrhyncha
- Family: Aphrophoridae
- Genus: Carystoterpa; Lallemand, 1936

Species
- See text

= Carystoterpa =

Genus of true bugs

Carystoterpa is a genus of spittlebug of the family Aphrophoridae.

== Species ==
- Carystoterpa aurata Hamilton & Morales, 1992
- Carystoterpa chelyon Hamilton & Morales, 1992
- Carystoterpa fingens (Walker, 1851)
- Carystoterpa fusiformis Hamilton & Morales, 1992
- Carystoterpa ikana Hamilton & Morales, 1992
- Carystoterpa maori Hamilton & Morales, 1992
- Carystoterpa minima Hamilton & Morales, 1992
- Carystoterpa minor Hamilton & Morales, 1992
- Carystoterpa subtacta (Walker, 1858)
- Carystoterpa subvirescens (Butler, 1874)
- Carystoterpa trimaculata (Butler, 1874)
- Carystoterpa tristis (Alfken, 1904)
- Carystoterpa vagans Hamilton & Morales, 1992
- Carystoterpa xenobilis Hamilton, 1981
