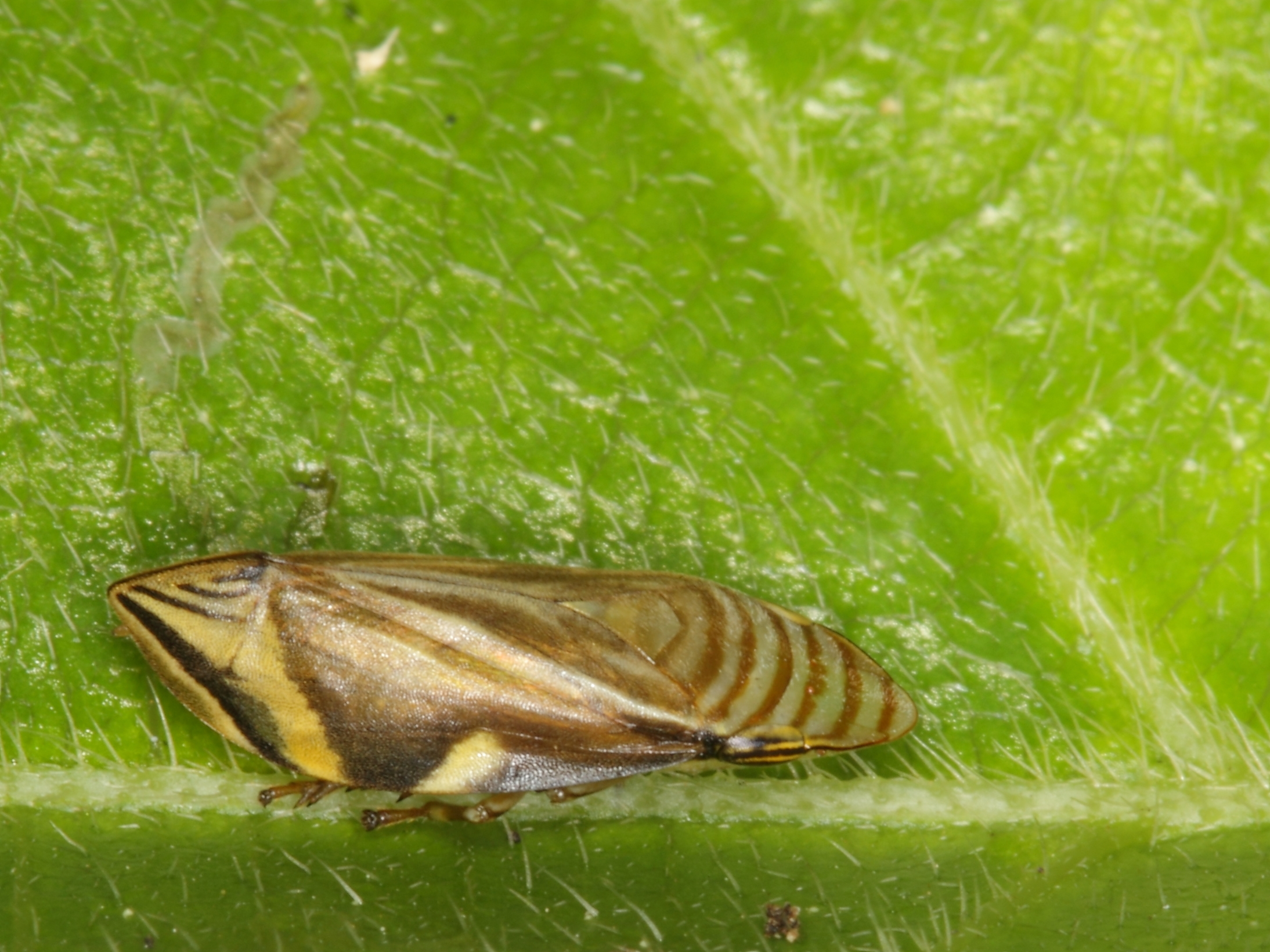
- A flatt spittlebug from a West-Javan lowland rainforest

Scientific classification
- Kingdom: Animalia
- Phylum: Arthropoda
- Clade: Pancrustacea
- Class: Insecta
- Order: Hemiptera
- Suborder: Auchenorrhyncha
- Family: Aphrophoridae
- Genus: Clovia; Stål, 1866

= Clovia =

Genus of insects

Clovia is a genus of true bugs belonging to the family Aphrophoridae.

The genus has almost cosmopolitan distribution.

== Species ==
Clovia contains the following species:

- Clovia albomarginata Melichar, 1911
- Clovia altipeta Lallemand, 1950
- Clovia amieti Synave, 1963
- Clovia andamanensis Distant, 1908
- Clovia ankazobeana Lallemand & Synave, 1952
- Clovia antankara Jacobi, 1917
- Clovia antoni Schmidt, 1922
- Clovia apicata Haglund, 1899
- Clovia aruensis Jacobi, 1921
- Clovia bananensis Synave, 1963
- Clovia batchianensis Distant, 1909
- Clovia beccari Schmidt, 1922
- Clovia bettotana Lallemand, 1932
- Clovia bifasciata Lallemand, 1940
- Clovia bigoti (Signoret, 1858)
- Clovia bilineata Lallemand, 1920
- Clovia binominata Lallemand, 1940
- Clovia bipars (Walker, 1857)
- Clovia bipunctata Kirby, 1891
- Clovia bivittata (Schmidt, 1920)
- Clovia boitardi (Montrouzier, 1855)
- Clovia borneensis Lallemand, 1932
- Clovia brunnea Lallemand, 1920
- Clovia burmanica Distant, 1916
- Clovia callifera (Stål, 1856)
- Clovia calundensis Synave, 1961
- Clovia camerunensis Schmidt, 1922
- Clovia capeneri Synave, 1963
- Clovia celebensis Schmidt, 1922
- Clovia centralis Distant, 1908
- Clovia chinai Lallemand, 1927
- Clovia clitellaria Duzee, [year?]
- Clovia concolor Lallemand, 1912
- Clovia conifera (Walker, 1851)
- Clovia conspicua Schmidt, 1922
- Clovia declivis Jacobi, 1910
- Clovia deplanata Lallemand, 1924
- Clovia diffusipennis Jacobi, 1944
- Clovia doreiensis Schmidt, 1922
- Clovia dorsalis Jacobi, 1921
- Clovia dryas Kirkaldy, 1905
- Clovia eranchiensis Synave, 1963
- Clovia eximia Kirby, 1900
- Clovia expressa (Walker, 1857)
- Clovia fasciata Lallemand, 1920
- Clovia flavifrons Schmidt, 1922
- Clovia flaviscutum Jacobi, 1921
- Clovia florum Jacobi, 1941
- Clovia formosa Schmidt, 1922
- Clovia fulgida Schmidt, 1922
- Clovia fulva Schmidt, 1922
- Clovia furcata (Walker, 1870)
- Clovia furcifera (Walker, 1870)
- Clovia fusiformis Lallemand & Synave, 1952
- Clovia grata Schmidt, 1922
- Clovia gressitti Lallemand & Synave, 1955
- Clovia hieroglyphica Lallemand & Synave, 1953
- Clovia humboldtiana Distant, 1909
- Clovia humeralis Kirby, 1891
- Clovia hyalinobipuncta Melichar, 1915
- Clovia immutata (Walker, 1857)
- Clovia incerta Lallemand, 1927
- Clovia janssensi Lallemand, 1941
- Clovia jeswieti Schmidt, 1930
- Clovia kinana Lallemand, 1932
- Clovia kleinei Schmidt, 1928
- Clovia lallemandana Metcalf, 1962
- Clovia latiuscula Jacobi, 1921
- Clovia leleupi Synave, 1960
- Clovia lemniscata (Stål, 1854)
- Clovia leopoldi Lallemand, 1931
- Clovia lepesmei Lallemand, 1942
- Clovia lineata Schmidt, 1920
- Clovia lineatocollis (de Motschulsky, 1859)
- Clovia lineolata Lallemand, 1922
- Clovia lituriplena (Walker, 1870)
- Clovia lomirana Lallemand, 1931
- Clovia loriae Schmidt, 1922
- Clovia luederwaldti Schmidt, 1922
- Clovia luteomaculata Lallemand, 1942
- Clovia maculata Lallemand, 1920
- Clovia maculosa Metcalf, 1962
- Clovia madegassa Lallemand, 1944
- Clovia maforensis Jacobi, 1921
- Clovia margheritae Distant, 1908
- Clovia masombweana Synave, 1957
- Clovia matemana Lallemand & Synave, 1955
- Clovia mindorensis Lallemand & Synave, 1953
- Clovia minuta Lallemand, 1920
- Clovia modesta Gibson, 1919
- Clovia montrouzieri Distant, 1920
- Clovia moresbyensis Distant, 1909
- Clovia muiri Lallemand, 1939
- Clovia multilineata (Stål, 1865)
- Clovia multipunctata Lallemand, 1931
- Clovia multisignata Breddin, 1901
- Clovia multivittata Haglund, 1899
- Clovia mundula Distant, 1916
- Clovia natalensis Lallemand, 1928
- Clovia nigerrima Jacobi, 1921
- Clovia nigricans Synave, 1969
- Clovia nigrifrons Schmidt, 1928
- Clovia novabritanniana Lallemand, 1942
- Clovia nox Schmidt, 1922
- Clovia obiana Lallemand, 1940
- Clovia obliqua Lallemand, 1924
- Clovia ocella (Thunberg, 1822)
- Clovia ornata (Walker, 1870)
- Clovia orti Schmidt, 1922
- Clovia patruelis (Stål, 1856)
- Clovia pauliani Lallemand, 1942
- Clovia penskyi Schmidt, 1922
- Clovia peracuta Jacobi, 1921
- Clovia perducta Jacobi, 1921
- Clovia permaculata (Jacobi, 1921)
- Clovia philippina Stål, 1870
- Clovia pilosula Distant, 1909
- Clovia planquettei Synave, 1964
- Clovia plena (Walker, 1870)
- Clovia polita Schmidt, 1922
- Clovia postica Jacobi, 1921
- Clovia prolixa (Stål, 1855)
- Clovia prolongata Jacobi, 1921
- Clovia pseudoprolixa Lallemand, 1920
- Clovia pseudoscutellata Lallemand, 1942
- Clovia puncta (Walker, 1851)
- Clovia quadrangularis Metcalf & Horton, 1934
- Clovia quinquesignata Lallemand, 1940
- Clovia recta Jacobi, 1921
- Clovia resinosa Jacobi, 1921
- Clovia robusta Jacobi, 1917
- Clovia roepstorffi Distant, 1908
- Clovia roonensis Lallemand, 1940
- Clovia rotundata Lallemand, 1940
- Clovia ruandana Synave, 1956
- Clovia rugosa Jacobi, 1917
- Clovia sarawakana Lallemand, 1939
- Clovia schulzei Schmidt, 1926
- Clovia scutellata Lallemand, 1940
- Clovia seguyi Lallemand, 1924
- Clovia sexfasciata Stål, 1870
- Clovia sexpunctata (Walker, 1870)
- Clovia sextaeniata Schmidt, 1922
- Clovia signata Distant, 1908
- Clovia signifera (Walker, 1857)
- Clovia similaris Metcalf, 1962
- Clovia soembana Lallemand, 1940
- Clovia solitaria Schmidt, 1922
- Clovia stevensi Lallemand, 1927
- Clovia strigata Jacobi, 1921
- Clovia subfurcata (Walker, 1870)
- Clovia suppressa Jacobi, 1921
- Clovia taeniatifrons Schmidt, 1922
- Clovia tenggerana Lallemand, 1940
- Clovia transversa (Walker, 1870)
- Clovia uluguruensis Synave, 1978
- Clovia undulata Schmidt, 1922
- Clovia varia (Walker, 1851)
- Clovia varipes (Walker, 1870)
- Clovia vicaria (Walker, 1870)
- Clovia vicinalis Schmidt, 1922
- Clovia victoriana Lallemand, 1942
- Clovia villosa Lallemand, 1924
- Clovia vitticeps Stål, 1870
- Clovia vittifrons Stål, 1870
- Clovia willei Schmidt, 1926
- Clovia wittei Synave, 1957
