= Plinia (bug) =

Scientific classification
- Domain: Eukaryota
- Kingdom: Animalia
- Phylum: Arthropoda
- Class: Insecta
- Order: Hemiptera
- Suborder: Auchenorrhyncha
- Family: Aphrophoridae
- Genus: Plinia; Stål, 1866

Genus of insects

Plinia is a genus of true bugs belonging to the family Aphrophoridae.

== Species ==
Plinia contains the following species:

- Plinia ampla (Walker, 1851)
- Plinia dorsalis Schmidt, 1919
- Plinia ineffecta (Walker, 1857)
- Plinia marginalis Schmidt, 1919
- Plinia pilosa Distant, 1909
- Plinia punctipennis Schmidt, 1919
