= Salomonia (bug) =

Scientific classification
- Kingdom: Animalia
- Phylum: Arthropoda
- Class: Insecta
- Order: Hemiptera
- Suborder: Auchenorrhyncha
- Family: Aphrophoridae
- Genus: Salomonia; Lallemand, 1944

Genus of insects

Salomonia is a genus of true bugs belonging to the family Aphrophoridae.

== Species ==
- Salomonia fusca Lallemand, 1940
