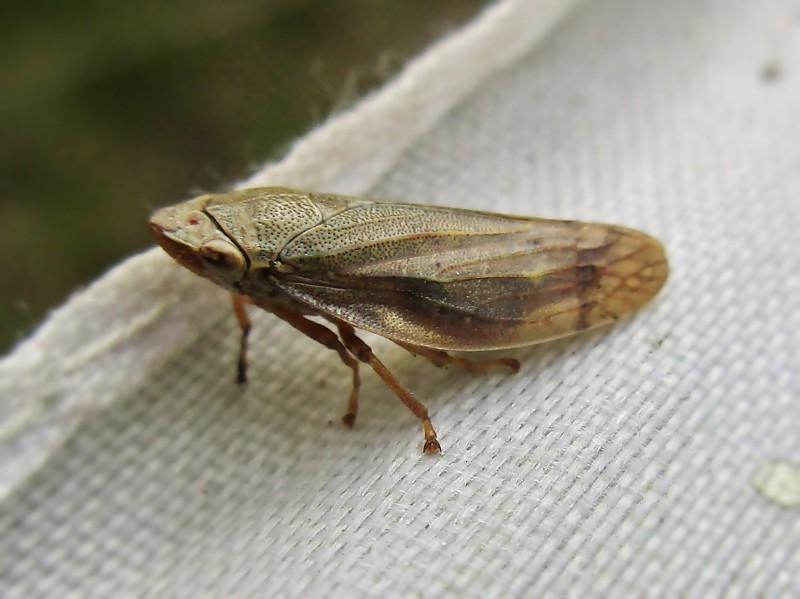
- Aphrophora salicina

Scientific classification
- Domain: Eukaryota
- Kingdom: Animalia
- Phylum: Arthropoda
- Class: Insecta
- Order: Hemiptera
- Suborder: Auchenorrhyncha
- Family: Aphrophoridae
- Genus: Aphrophora; Germar, 1821

= Aphrophora =

Genus of true bugs

Aphrophora is a genus of spittlebugs in the family Aphrophoridae. There are at least 80 described species in Aphrophora.

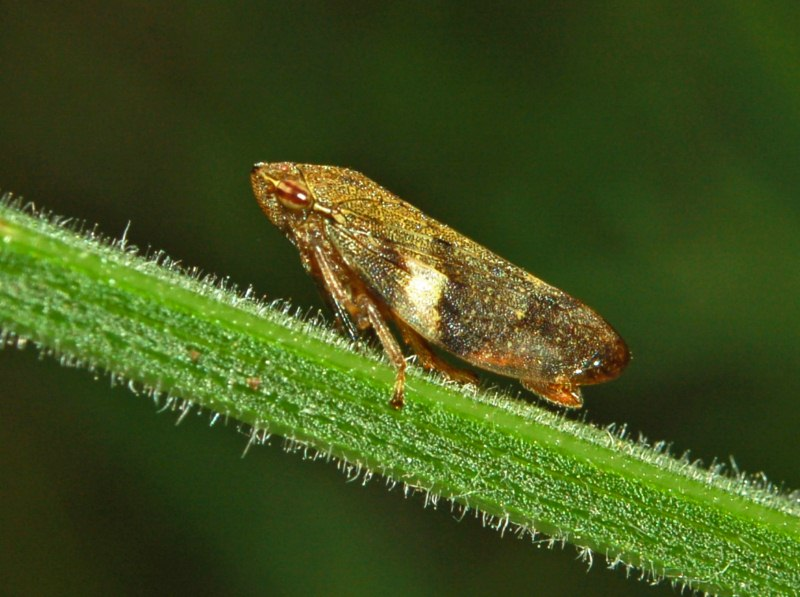
Aphrophora alni

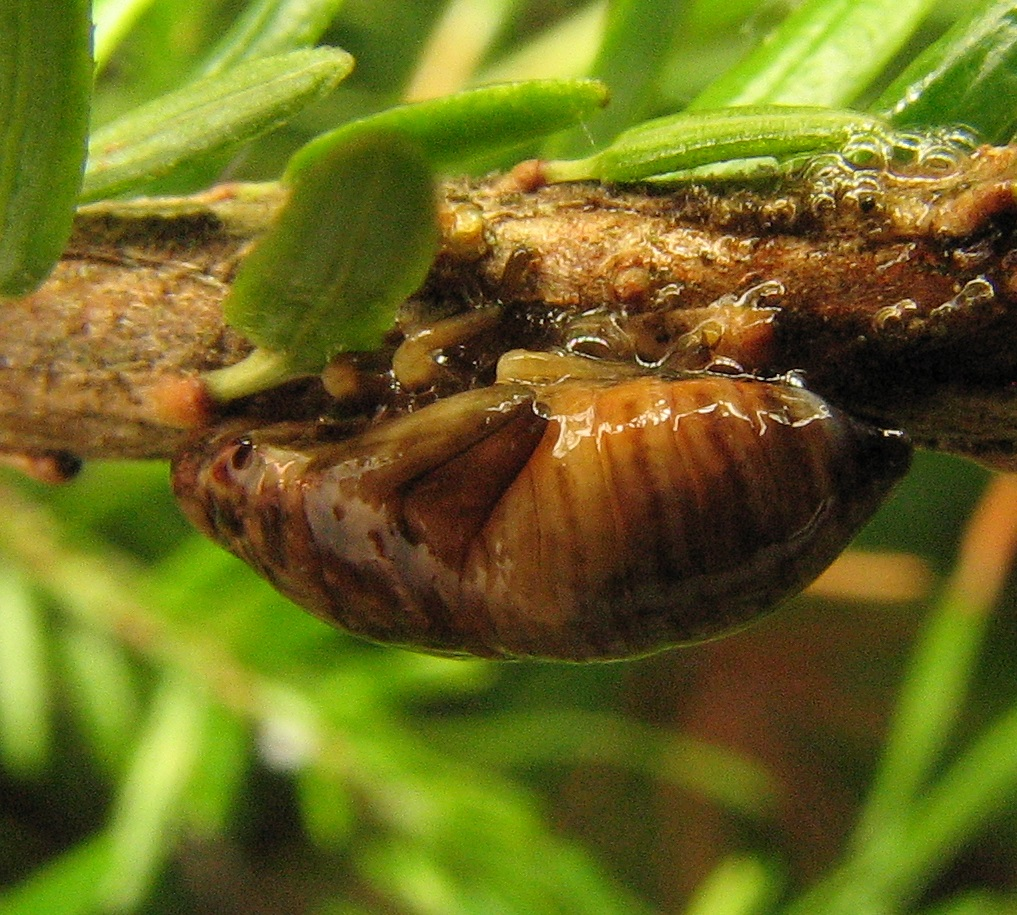
Aphrophora nymph, probably Aphrophora saratogensis on hemlock

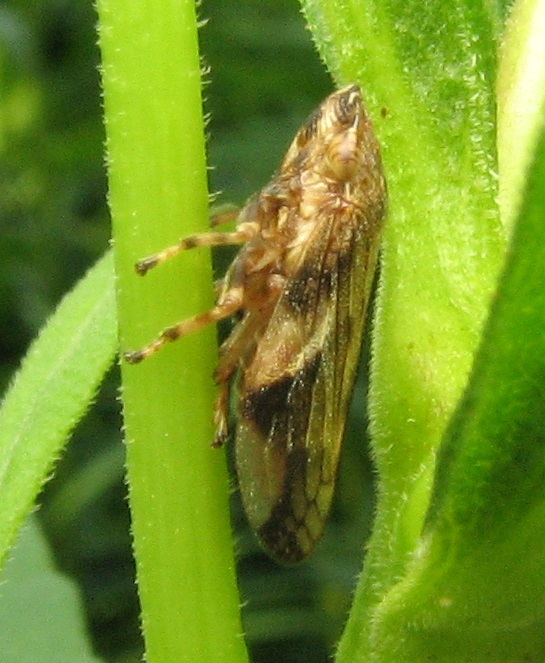
Aphrophora quadrinotata

== Species ==
Species within this genus include:

- Aphrophora alni (Fallén, 1805) (European alder spittlebug)
- Aphrophora ambigua Jacobi, 1944
- Aphrophora ampliata Hamilton, 1982
- Aphrophora angulata Ball, 1899
- †Aphrophora angusta Handlirsch, 1910 (Ypresian, Allenby Formation)
- Aphrophora annulata Ball, 1899
- Aphrophora aurata Capanni, 1894
- Aphrophora bimaculata Distant, 1908
- Aphrophora binomoriensis Matsumura, 1934
- Aphrophora bipartita Jacobi, 1944
- Aphrophora bipunctata Melichar, 1902
- Aphrophora bisignata Walker, 1858
- Aphrophora brachycephala Distant, 1908
- Aphrophora canadensis Walley, 1928
- Aphrophora chilensis Spinola, 1852
- Aphrophora consobrina Jacobi, 1943
- Aphrophora consocia Melichar, 1902
- Aphrophora corticea Germar, 1821
- Aphrophora cribrata (Walker, 1851) (pine spittlebug)
- Aphrophora detrita (Walker, 1851)
- Aphrophora detritus Walker, 1851
- Aphrophora eruginosa Capanni, 1894
- Aphrophora exoleta Horváth, 1901
- Aphrophora exoleta Horváth, 1901
- Aphrophora flavicosta Kato, 1933
- Aphrophora forneri (Haupt, 1919)
- Aphrophora fulva Doering, 1941
- Aphrophora gelida (Walker, 1851) (boreal spittlebug)
- Aphrophora grisea Fowler, 1897
- Aphrophora harimaensis Matsumura, 1904
- Aphrophora harmandi Lallemand, 1924
- Aphrophora horishana Matsumura, 1940
- Aphrophora horizontalis Kato, 1933
- Aphrophora impressa Metcalf & Horton, 1934
- Aphrophora inflexa Walker, 1858
- Aphrophora irrorata Ball, 1899
- Aphrophora jacobii Metcalf, 1962
- Aphrophora jalapae Jacobi, 1921
- Aphrophora karenkoensis Kato, 1933
- Aphrophora koshireana Matsumura, 1940
- Aphrophora laevior Fowler, 1897
- Aphrophora maculata Capanni, 1894
- Aphrophora maculosa Doering, 1941
- Aphrophora major Uhler, 1896
- Aphrophora mandschurica Jacobi, 1943
- Aphrophora matsumurai Oshanin, 1908
- Aphrophora memorabilis Walker, 1858
- Aphrophora meridionalis Horváth, 1907
- Aphrophora moorei Distant, 1908
- Aphrophora murina Melichar, 1902
- Aphrophora naevia Jacobi, 1944
- Aphrophora nagasawae Matsumura, 1907
- Aphrophora nancyae Distant, 1908
- Aphrophora nigronervosa (Lallemand, 1924)
- Aphrophora nuwarana Distant, 1916
- Aphrophora okinawana Matsumura, 1936
- Aphrophora ovalis Jacobi, 1921
- Aphrophora parallella (Say, 1824) (spruce spittlebug)
- Aphrophora peanensis Matsumura, 1940
- Aphrophora perdubia Fowler, 1897
- Aphrophora permutata Uhler, 1875 (douglas-fir spittlebug)
- Aphrophora phlava Capanni, 1894
- Aphrophora phuliginosa Capanni, 1894
- Aphrophora policlora Capanni, 1894
- Aphrophora princeps Walley, 1928 (cone spittlebug)
- Aphrophora punctifrons Spinola, 1850
- Aphrophora punctipes Walley, 1928
- Aphrophora quadriguttata Melichar, 1902
- Aphrophora quadrinotata Say, 1831 (four-spotted spittlebug)
- Aphrophora regina Hamilton, 1982
- Aphrophora rubiginosa Melichar, 1902
- Aphrophora rubra Capanni, 1894
- Aphrophora rufiventris Walker, 1851
- Aphrophora rugosipennis Jacobi, 1921
- Aphrophora sachalinensis Matsumura, 1907
- Aphrophora salicina (Goeze, 1778) (willow spittlebug)
- Aphrophora salicis (De Geer, 1773)
- Aphrophora saratogensis (Fitch, 1851) (Saratoga spittlebug)
- Aphrophora signoretii Fitch, 1856
- Aphrophora similis Lethierry, 1888
- Aphrophora straminea Kato, 1932
- Aphrophora tahagii Matsumura, 1940
- Aphrophora takaii Matsumura, 1934
- Aphrophora tomom Matsumura, 1940
- Aphrophora vittata Matsumura, 1903
- Aphrophora yohenai Matsumura, 1934
