= Paraphilaenus =

Scientific classification
- Domain: Eukaryota
- Kingdom: Animalia
- Phylum: Arthropoda
- Class: Insecta
- Order: Hemiptera
- Suborder: Auchenorrhyncha
- Family: Aphrophoridae
- Genus: Paraphilaenus; Vilbaste, 1962

Genus of insects

Paraphilaenus is a genus of true bugs belonging to the family Aphrophoridae.

The species of this genus are found in Central Asia.

== Species ==
Species:

- Paraphilaenus notatus (Mulsant & Rey, 1855)
