= Mesoptyelus =

Scientific classification
- Kingdom: Animalia
- Phylum: Arthropoda
- Clade: Pancrustacea
- Class: Insecta
- Order: Hemiptera
- Suborder: Auchenorrhyncha
- Family: Aphrophoridae
- Genus: Mesoptyelus; Matsumura, 1904

Genus of insects

Mesoptyelus is a genus of true bugs belonging to the family Aphrophoridae.

The species of this genus are found in Japan.

== Species ==
Species:

- Mesoptyelus arisanus Matsumura, 1940
- Mesoptyelus auropilosus Kato, 1933
- Mesoptyelus coreanus Matsumura, 1940
- Mesoptyelus fascialis Kato, 1933
- Mesoptyelus iranicus Tishechkin, 2013
- Mesoptyelus karenkonis Matsumura, 1940
- Mesoptyelus nengyosanus Matsumura, 1942
- Mesoptyelus nigrifrons Matsumura, 1904
- Mesoptyelus okamotonis Matsumura, 1940
- Mesoptyelus yagonis Matsumura, 1940
