= Peuceptyelus =

Scientific classification
- Domain: Eukaryota
- Kingdom: Animalia
- Phylum: Arthropoda
- Class: Insecta
- Order: Hemiptera
- Suborder: Auchenorrhyncha
- Family: Aphrophoridae
- Genus: Peuceptyelus; Sahlberg, 1871

Genus of true bugs

Peuceptyelus is a genus of true bugs belonging to the family Aphrophoridae.

The species of this genus are found in Northern Europe and Japan.

Species:

- Peuceptyelus bufonius Jacobi, 1921
- Peuceptyelus burmanicus (Distant, 1908)
