= Handschinia (bug) =

Scientific classification
- Domain: Eukaryota
- Kingdom: Animalia
- Phylum: Arthropoda
- Class: Insecta
- Order: Hemiptera
- Suborder: Auchenorrhyncha
- Family: Aphrophoridae
- Genus: Handschinia; Lallemand, 1935

Genus of insects

Handschinia is a genus of true bugs belonging to the family Aphrophoridae.

== Species ==
Species:

- Handschinia melanotum Hamilton, 1980
- Handschinia orca Hamilton, 1980
- Handschinia salomonis Lallemand, 1935
