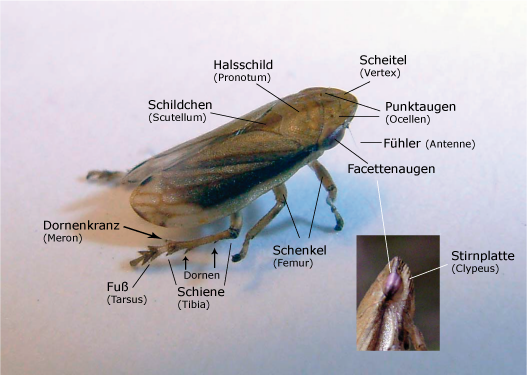
- Neophilaenus lineatus

Scientific classification
- Domain: Eukaryota
- Kingdom: Animalia
- Phylum: Arthropoda
- Class: Insecta
- Order: Hemiptera
- Suborder: Auchenorrhyncha
- Family: Aphrophoridae
- Genus: Neophilaenus; Haupt, 1935

= Neophilaenus =

Genus of true bugs

Neophilaenus is a genus of spittlebugs in the family Aphrophoridae. There are about 10 described species in Neophilaenus.

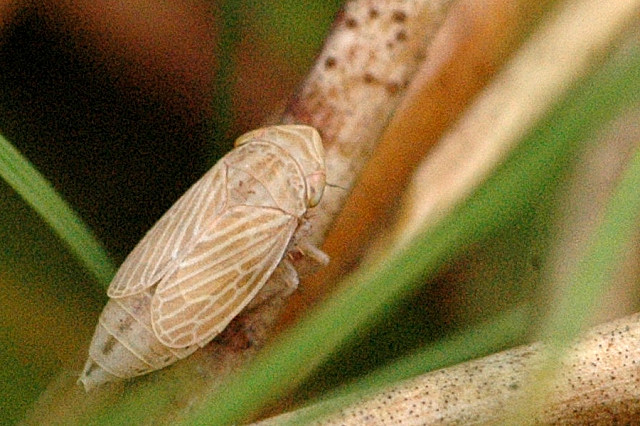
Neophilaenus lineatus

== Species ==
These 10 species belong to the genus Neophilaenus:

- Neophilaenus albipennis (Fabricius, 1798)
- Neophilaenus angustipennis (Horváth, 1909)
- Neophilaenus campestris (Fallén, 1805)
- Neophilaenus exclamationis (Thunberg, 1874)
- Neophilaenus infumatus (Haupt, 1917)
- Neophilaenus limpidus (Wagner, 1935)
- Neophilaenus lineatus (Linnaeus, 1758) (lined spittlebug)
- Neophilaenus longiceps (Puton, 1895)
- Neophilaenus minor (Kirschbaum, 1868)
- Neophilaenus modestus (Haupt, 1922)
