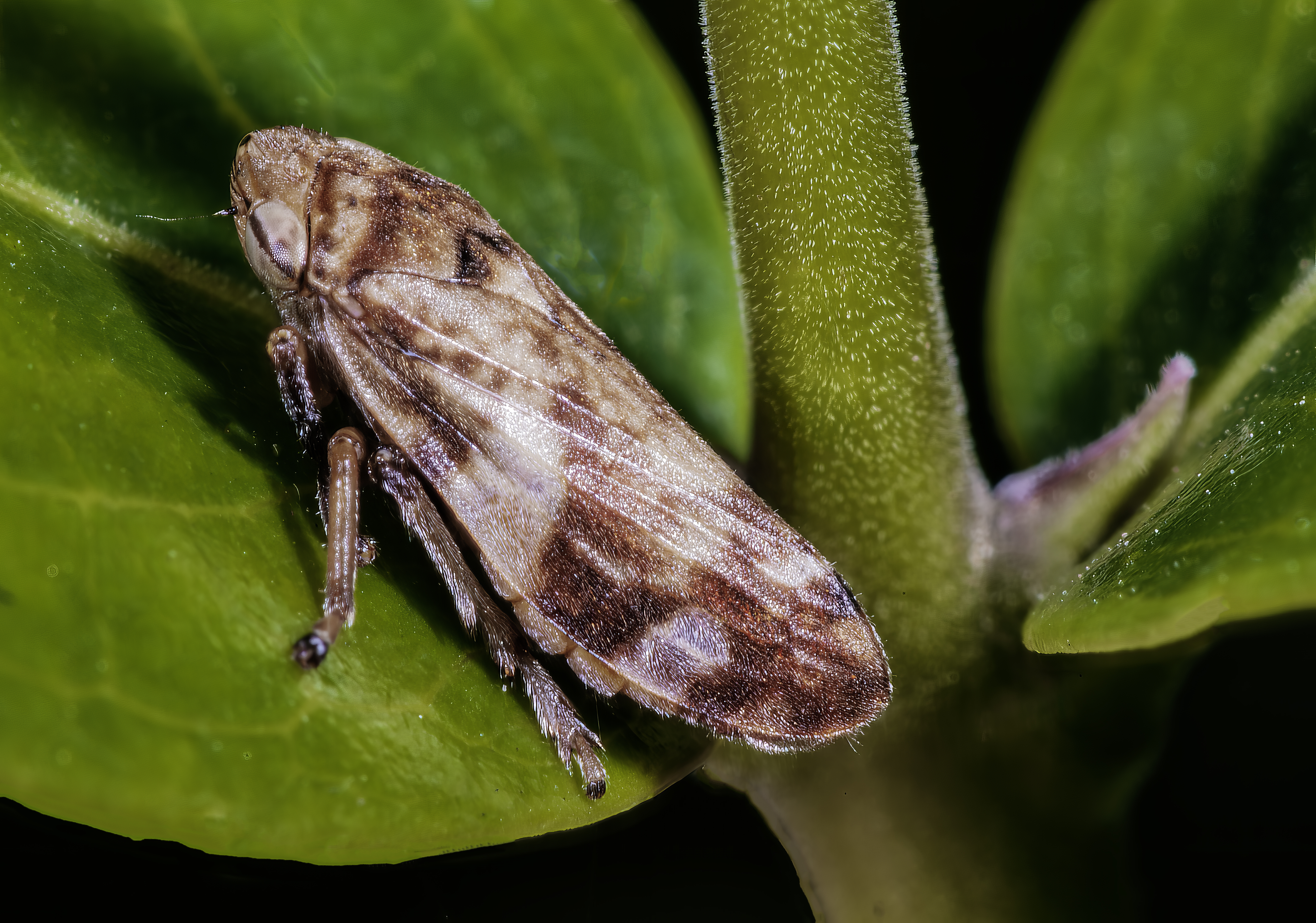
- Philaenus spumarius

Scientific classification
- Kingdom: Animalia
- Phylum: Arthropoda
- Clade: Pancrustacea
- Class: Insecta
- Order: Hemiptera
- Suborder: Auchenorrhyncha
- Superfamily: Cercopoidea
- Family: Aphrophoridae; Amyot & Serville, 1843

Diversity
- At least 150 genera

= Aphrophoridae =

Family of true bugs

The Aphrophoridae are a family of spittlebugs belonging to the order Hemiptera. There are at least 160 genera and 990 described species in Aphrophoridae.

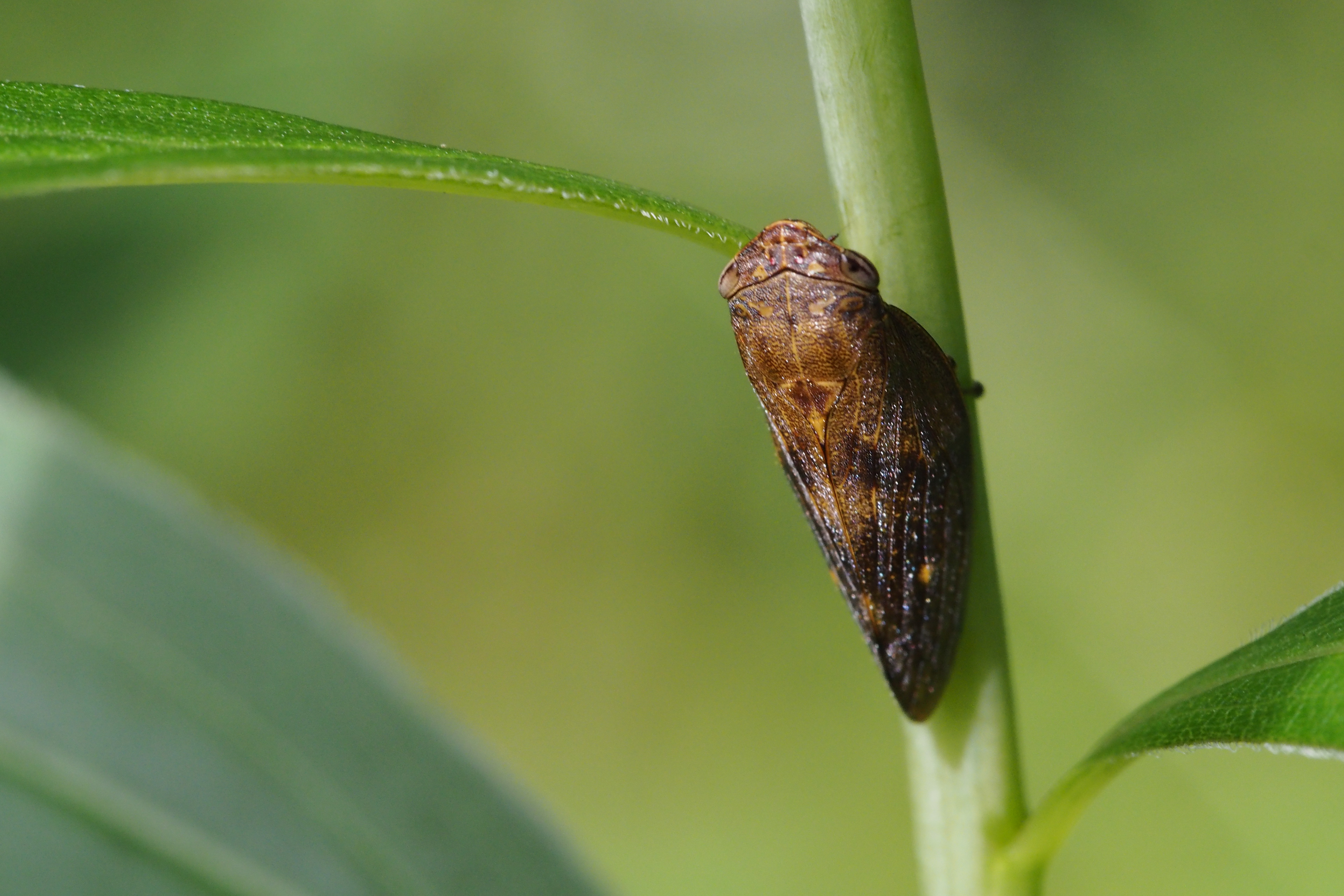
Yezophora flavomaculata

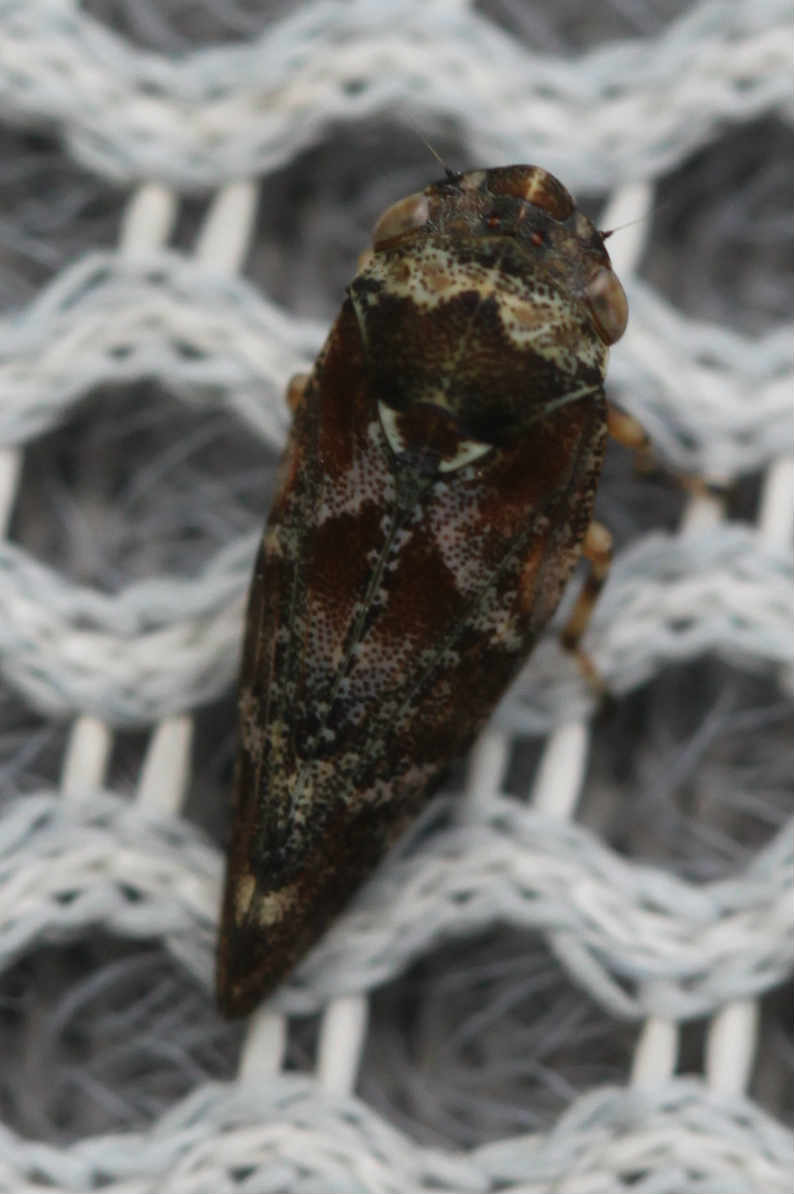
Aphrophora corticea

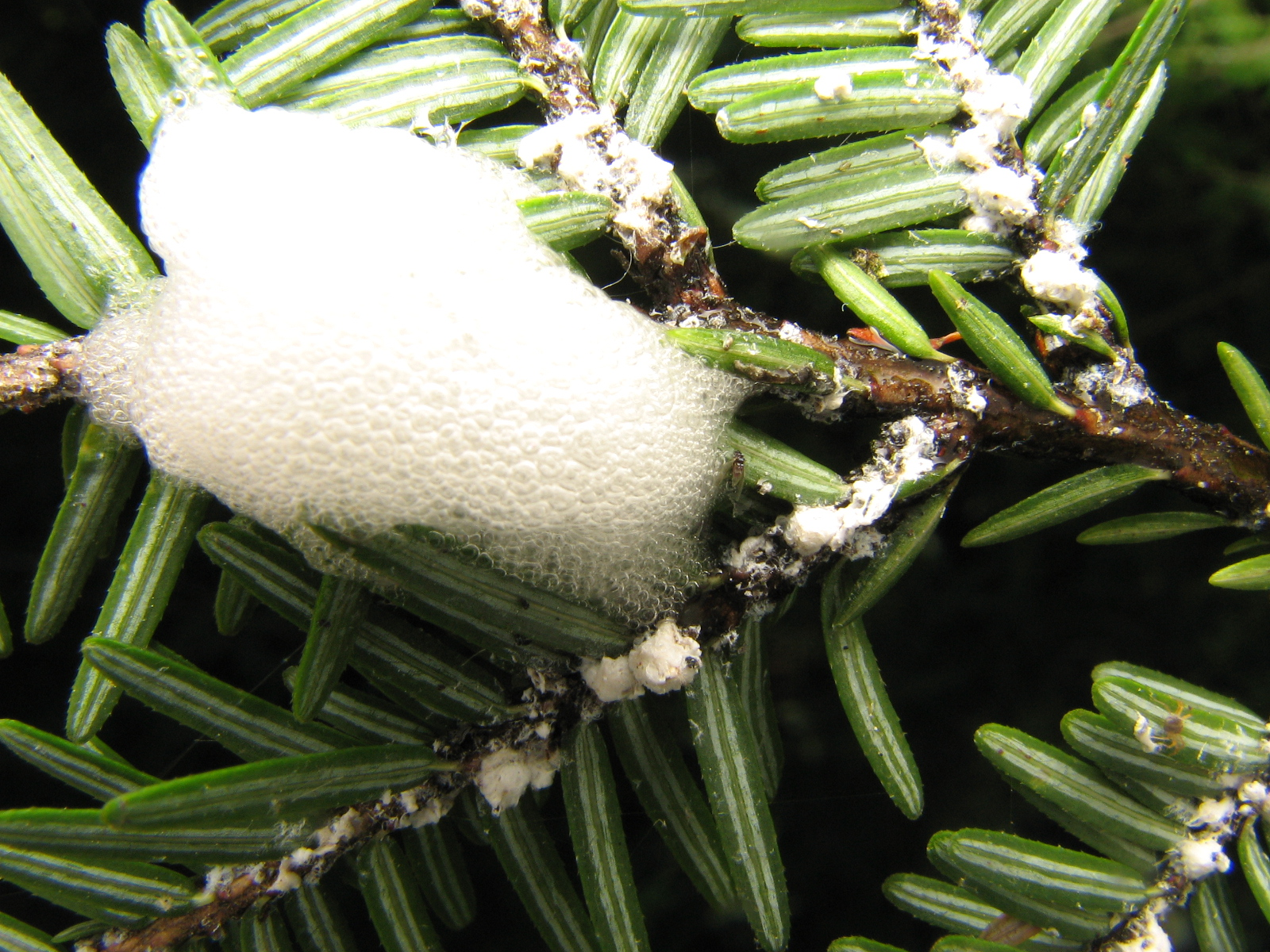
Aphrophora nymph inside its spittle.

== Taxonomy ==
- - Membracoidea
  - - Cicadoidea
    - Cercopoidea
      - - Machaerotidae
        - Clastopteridae
      - - Cercopidae
        - Aphrophoridae (incl. Epipyginae)

Relationships with other groups based on Cryan (2005).

Traditionally, most of the superfamily Cercopoidea was considered a single family, the Cercopidae, but this family has been split into three families for many years now: the Aphrophoridae, Cercopidae, and Clastopteridae. All molecular analyses published since 2005 indicate that Aphrophoridae is monophyletic, but only if the Epipyginae is retained within Aphrophoridae as a subfamily or tribe within Aphrophoridae, rather than excluded as a separate family ("Epipygidae").

== European genera ==
- Aphrophora Germar 1821
- Lepyronia Amyot & Serville 1843
- Mesoptyelus Matsumura 1904
- Neophilaenus Haupt 1935
- Paraphilaenus Vilbaste 1962
- Peuceptyelus Sahlberg 1871
- Philaenus Stål 1864

== See also ==
- List of Aphrophoridae genera
- Froghopper
