= Tomaspis inclusa =

Scientific classification
- Kingdom: Animalia
- Phylum: Arthropoda
- Class: Insecta
- Order: Hemiptera
- Suborder: Auchenorrhyncha
- Family: Ischnorhinidae
- Genus: Tomaspis
- Species: T. inclusa

Binomial name
- Tomaspis inclusa (Walker, 1858)

Species of true bug

Tomaspis inclusa is a species of true bug from the family Ischnorhinidae (formerly Cercopidae). The species was described in 1858 by Walker.
