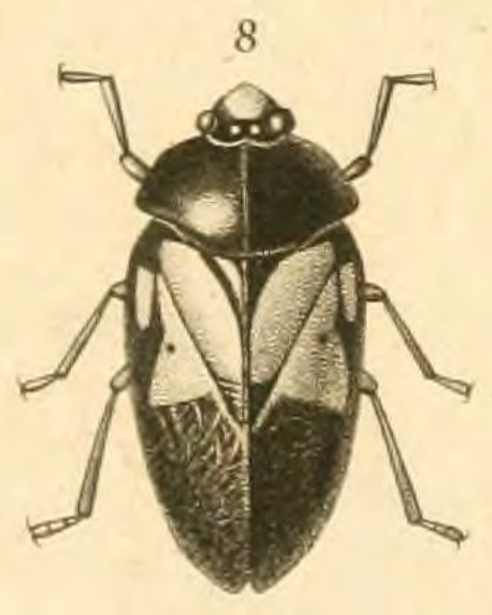

Scientific classification
- Kingdom: Animalia
- Phylum: Arthropoda
- Clade: Pancrustacea
- Class: Insecta
- Order: Hemiptera
- Suborder: Auchenorrhyncha
- Family: Ischnorhinidae
- Genus: Choconta
- Species: C. circulata

Binomial name
- Choconta circulata Guérin-Méneville, 1844

Synonyms
- Cercopis circulatus Guérin-Méneville, 1844; Sphenorhina circulata Lallemand, 1912; Tomaspis circulata Fennah, 1979

= Choconta circulata =

Species of true bug

Choconta circulata is a species of froghopper in the genus Choconta, of the family of Cercopidae. The species has been named formerly Sphenorhina circulata (Lallemand), Tomaspis circulata (Fennah), and originally Cercopis circulatus. The species has been described first by French entomologist Félix Édouard Guérin-Méneville in 1844.

== Etymology and habitat ==
The genus Choconta is named after the town of Chocontá, Cundinamarca, on the Altiplano Cundiboyacense, Colombia, former territory of the Muisca. The froghopper has been found in Bogotá. Later discoveries of the species have been done in Venezuela.

== Description ==
The 17 millimetres (0.67 in) long froghopper has a black body with a red anus. The wings are granulated with a yellow irregular part in the middle. The upper part of the head and lower part above the thorax is red. The legs are black with red on top of the feet.

== Bibliography ==
- Gray, John Edward (1851), List of the Specimens of Homopterous Insects in the Collection of the British Museum - Part III (PDF), pp. 1–907
- Guérin-Méneville, Félix Édouard (1844), Iconographie du Règne Animal de Georges Cuvier (PDF), pp. 354–373
