= Choconta =

Choconta may refer to:

- Chocontá, a municipality in the department of Cundinamarca, Colombia
- Choconta (froghopper), a genus of froghoppers
