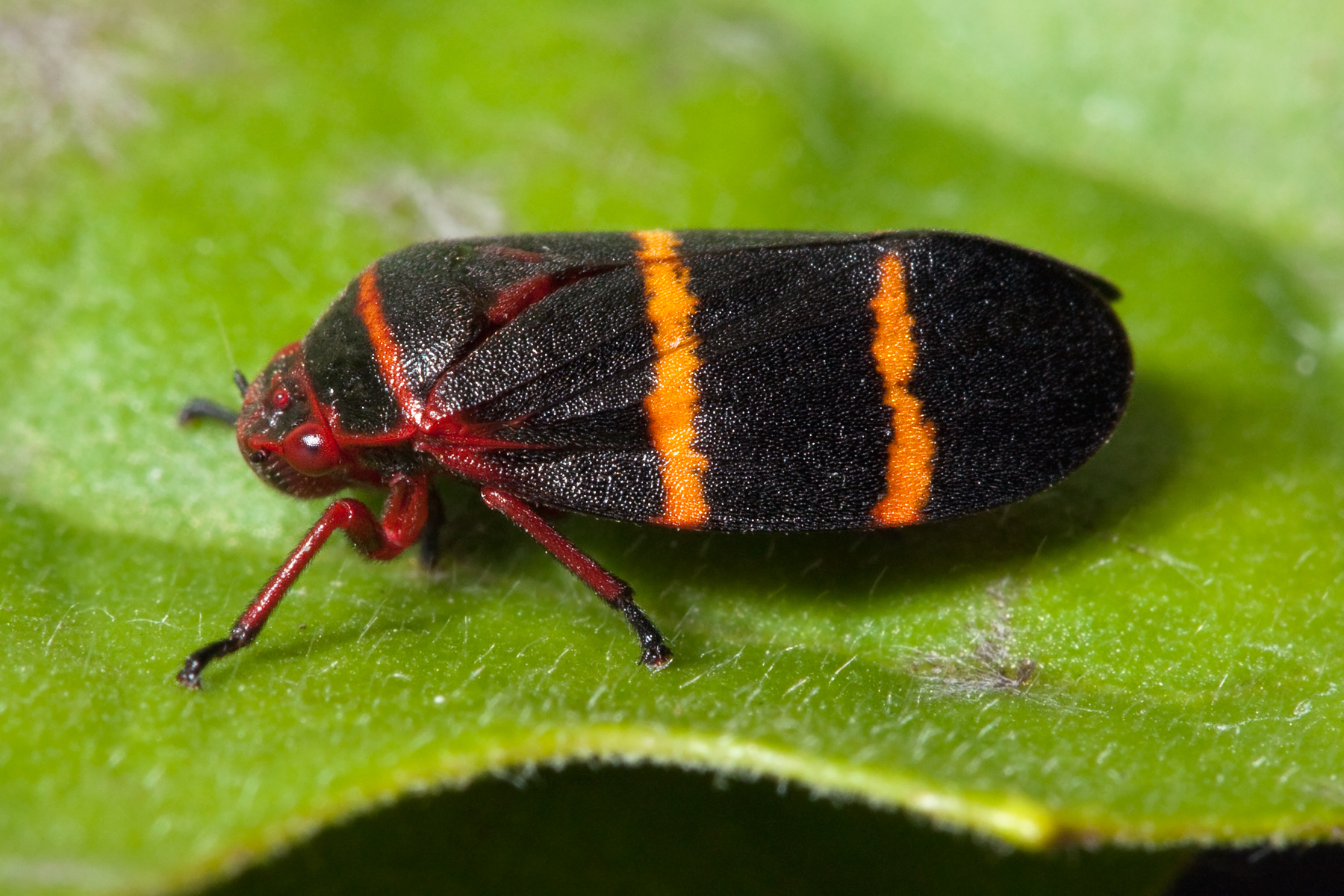

Scientific classification
- Domain: Eukaryota
- Kingdom: Animalia
- Phylum: Arthropoda
- Class: Insecta
- Order: Hemiptera
- Suborder: Auchenorrhyncha
- Family: Ischnorhinidae
- Genus: Prosapia
- Species: P. bicincta

Binomial name
- Prosapia bicincta (Say, 1830)

= Prosapia bicincta =

Species of true bug

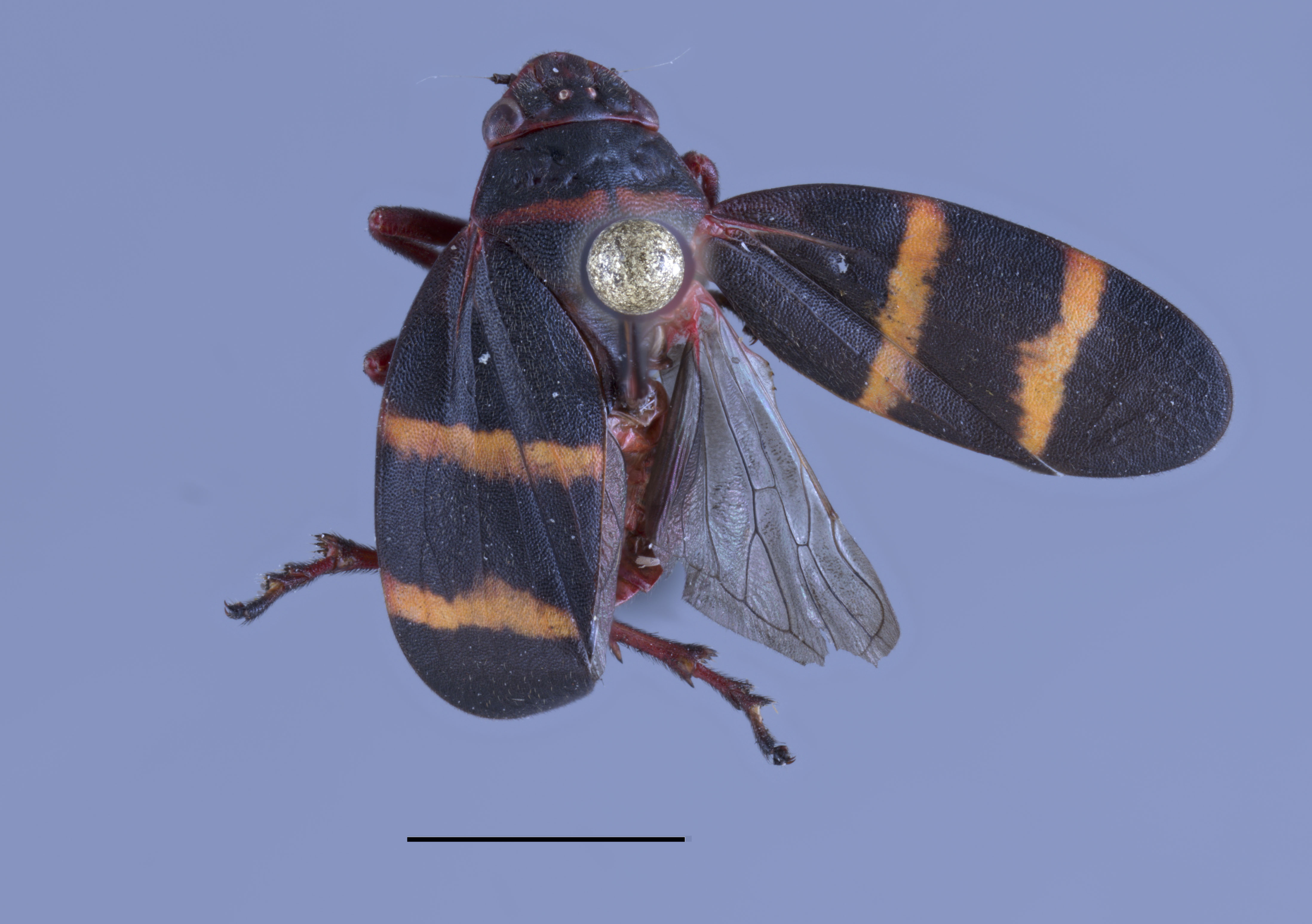
Image of the two-lined spittlebug, Prosapia bicincta (Say, 1830), collected from a grassy area in Haddock, Georgia. Scale bar represents 0.5 cm.

Prosapia bicincta, the two-lined spittlebug, is a species of insect in the family Ischnorhinidae (formerly Cercopidae). Adults are black with two red or orange lines crossing the wings. It reaches a length of 8–10 mm. It is widespread in the eastern half of the United States. A similar species, Prosapia simulans, can be found throughout Central America where it is considered an agricultural pest.

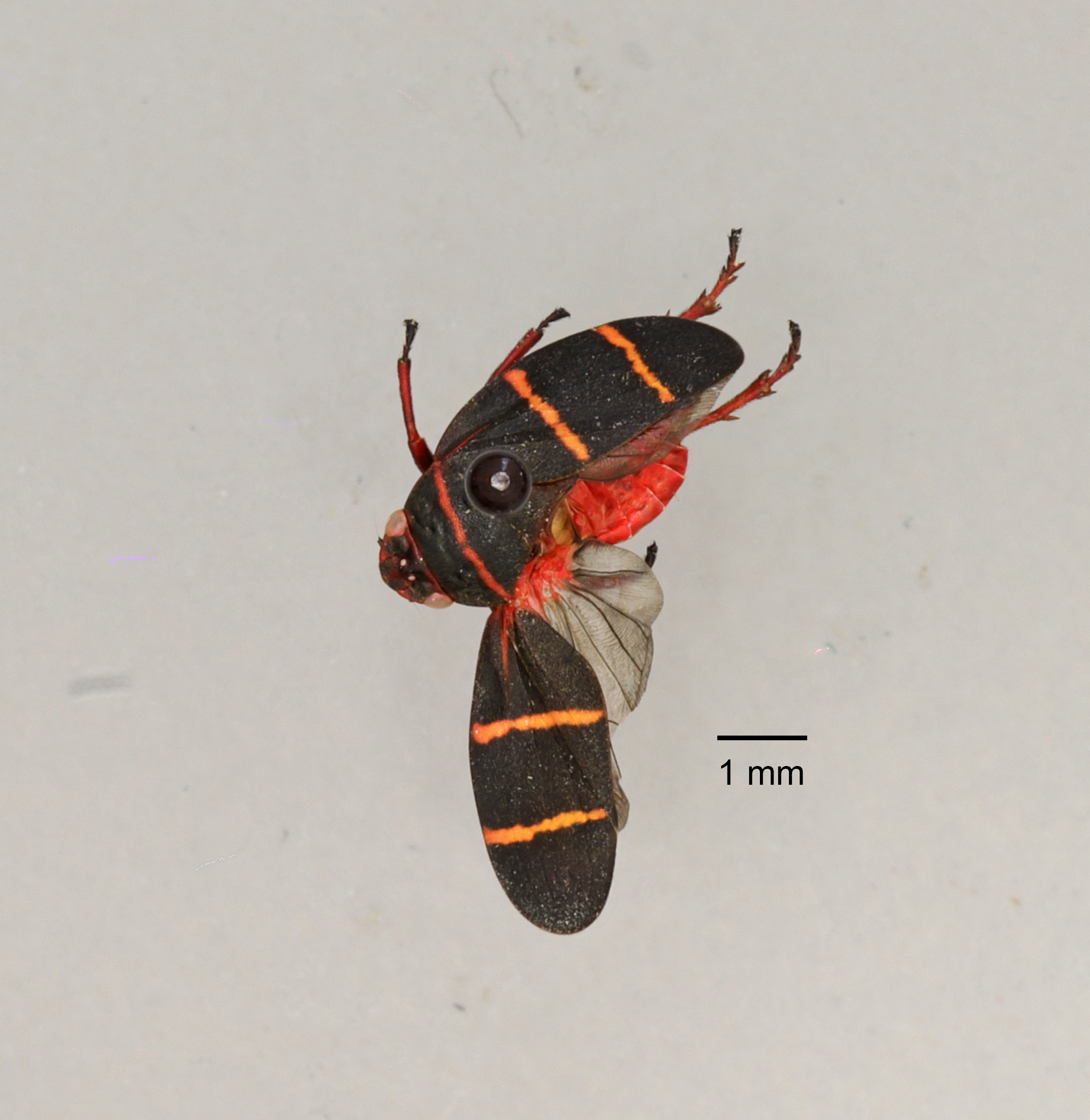
Pinned Prosapia bicincta, collected in Milledgeville, Ga

Nymphs feed on various grasses (including centipedegrass, bermudagrass and corn) from within foam (consisting of their own spittle) produced from juices of their host plant. Adults feed on the leaves of both native and introduced species of holly, as well as on the leaves of the eastern redbud tree. It is a pest of forage grasses and turf grasses such as those grown for lawns and its consumption of these plants causes economic damage throughout the southeastern United States.

Since 2016, P. bicincta has been associated with dying patches of pasture on the island of Hawaiʻi. By 2022, the distribution of the infestation had expanded, reached more than 70,000 ha and had caused serious, widespread and long-term damage to large areas of rangelands and pastures on the island.
