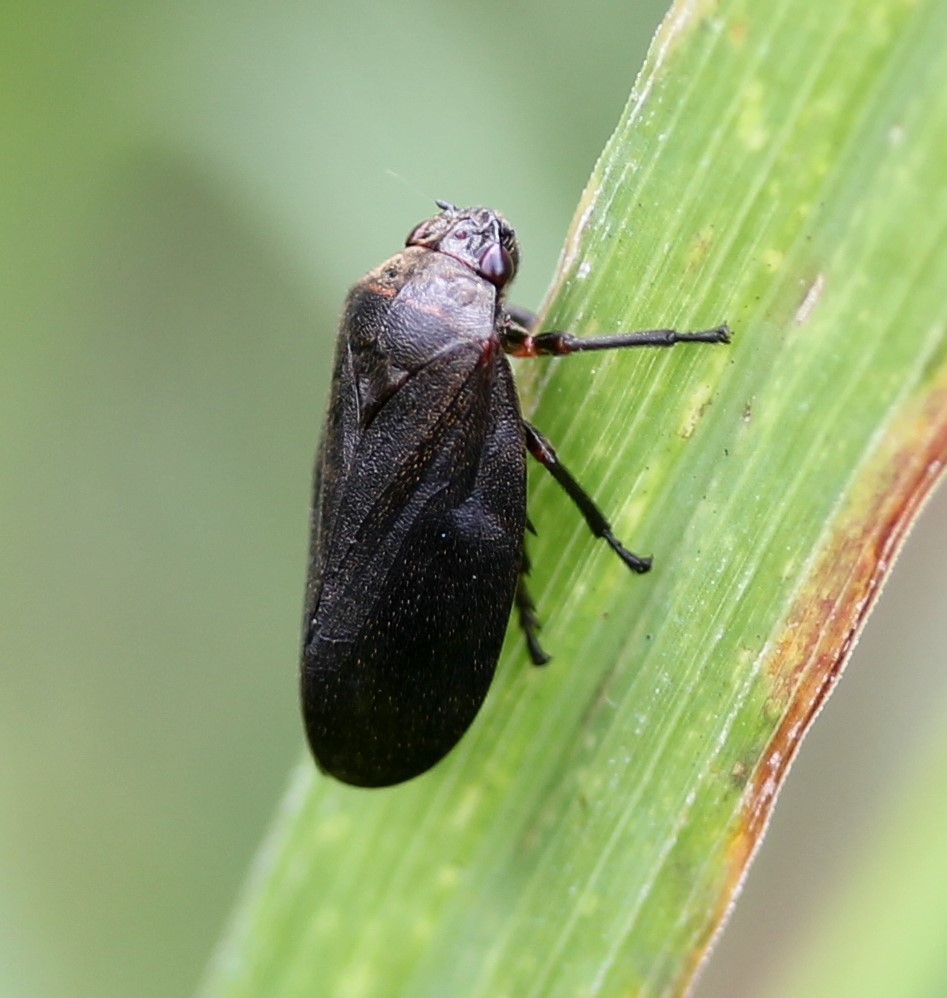

Scientific classification
- Domain: Eukaryota
- Kingdom: Animalia
- Phylum: Arthropoda
- Class: Insecta
- Order: Hemiptera
- Suborder: Auchenorrhyncha
- Family: Ischnorhinidae
- Genus: Prosapia
- Species: P. ignipectus

Binomial name
- Prosapia ignipectus (Fitch, 1851)

= Prosapia ignipectus =

Species of true bug

Prosapia ignipectus, known generally as the red-legged spittlebug or black spittlebug, is a species of froghopper in the family Ischnorhinidae (formerly Cercopidae). It is found in North America. It measures about 8 mm (0.3 in) in length.
