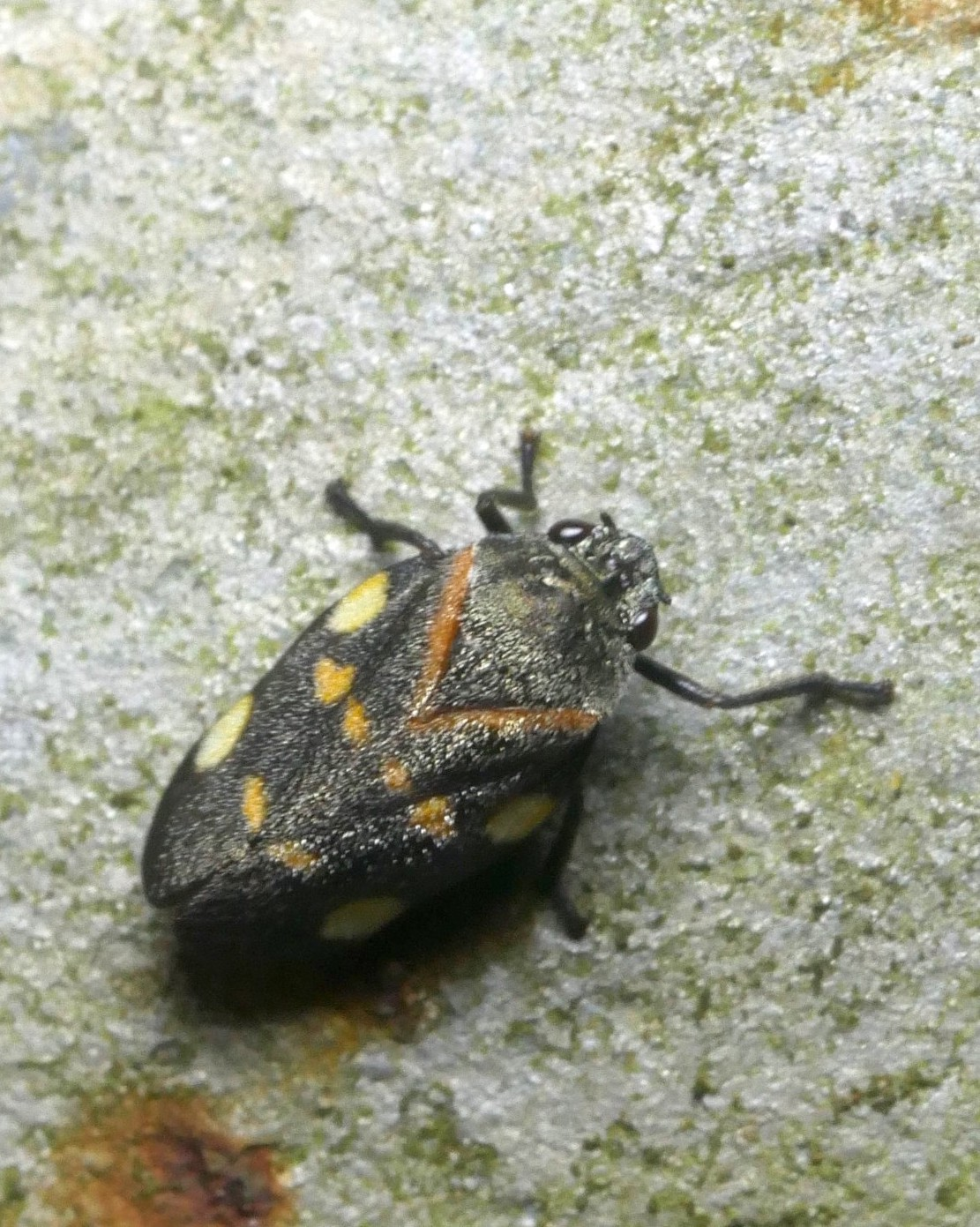

Scientific classification
- Kingdom: Animalia
- Phylum: Arthropoda
- Class: Insecta
- Order: Hemiptera
- Suborder: Auchenorrhyncha
- Family: Ischnorhinidae
- Genus: Aeneolamia
- Species: A. lepidior

Binomial name
- Aeneolamia lepidior Fowler, 1897

Synonyms
- Tomaspis lepidior Fowler, 1897

= Aeneolamia lepidior =

Species of true bug

Aeneolamia lepidior is a species of Cicadomorpha in the froghopper family (Cercopidae). It was first recognized as a species in 1897 by William Weekes Fowler. It has been reported in Costa Rica, Panama, and Colombia, Peru, Bolivia, Suriname and Brazil.
