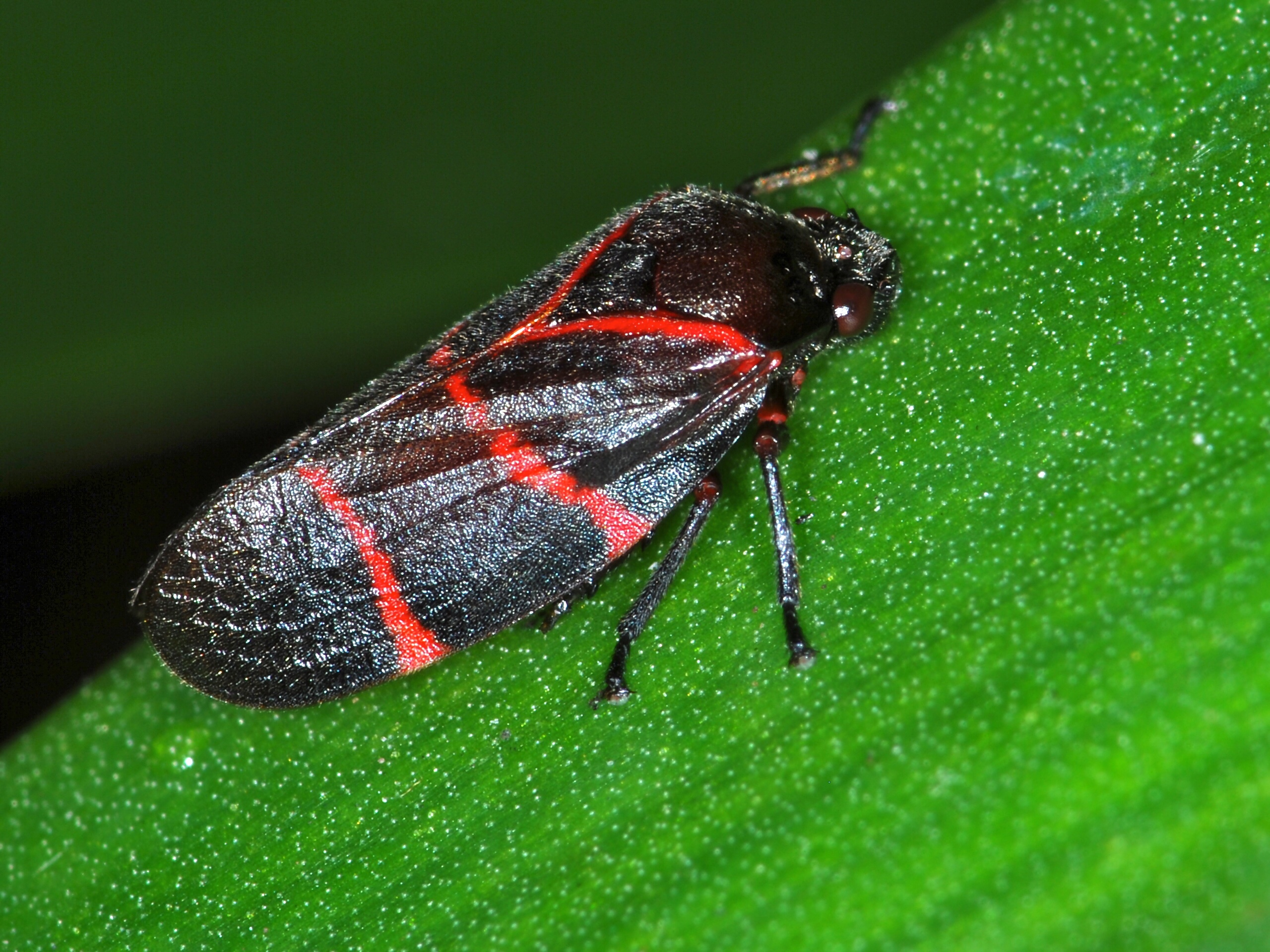
- Tomaspis jugata

Scientific classification
- Domain: Eukaryota
- Kingdom: Animalia
- Phylum: Arthropoda
- Class: Insecta
- Order: Hemiptera
- Suborder: Auchenorrhyncha
- Family: Ischnorhinidae
- Subfamily: Ischnorhininae
- Tribe: Tomaspidini
- Genus: Tomaspis; Amyot & Serville, 1843

Type species
- Tomaspis furcata

Species
- See text

= Tomaspis =

Genus of true bugs

Tomaspis is a genus of froghopper in the family Ischnorhinidae (formerly Cercopidae). The genus was first described by Amyot & Serville in 1843.

== Species ==
23 species are recognized within Tomaspis:

- Tomaspis basifura Melichar, 1912
- Tomaspis biolleyi (Distant, 1900)
- Tomaspis costalimar Franco, 1953
- Tomaspis crocea (Walker, 1851)
- Tomaspis cruralis (Stål, 1862)
- Tomaspis discoidea Melichar, 1915
- Tomaspis flexuosa (Walker, 1851)
- Tomaspis furcata (Germar, 1821)
- Tomaspis handlirschi Fowler, 1897
- Tomaspis inclusa (Walker, 1858)
- Tomaspis intermedia Fowler, 1897
- Tomaspis miles Fowler, 1897
- Tomaspis nigricans Amyot & Serville, 1843
- Tomaspis nigrofasciata Melichar, 1908
- Tomaspis perezii Berg, 1879
- Tomaspis platensis Berg, 1883
- Tomaspis pulchralis Valdes Ragues, 1910
- Tomaspis rubripennis (Blanchard & Brulle, 1846)
- Tomaspis rufopicea (Walker, 1852)
- Tomaspis semimaculata Fowler, 1897
- Tomaspis tripars (Walker, 1858)
- Tomaspis venosa (Walker, 1851)
- Tomaspis xanthocephala (Walker, 1858)
