= Kanaima =

Kanaima may refer to:

- Kanaima (froghopper), a genus of insects
- Kanaima (Sorcerer), sorcerers in Wapishana, Patamuna, and other highland Guianese beliefs
- Kanimaa, a 2025 song
