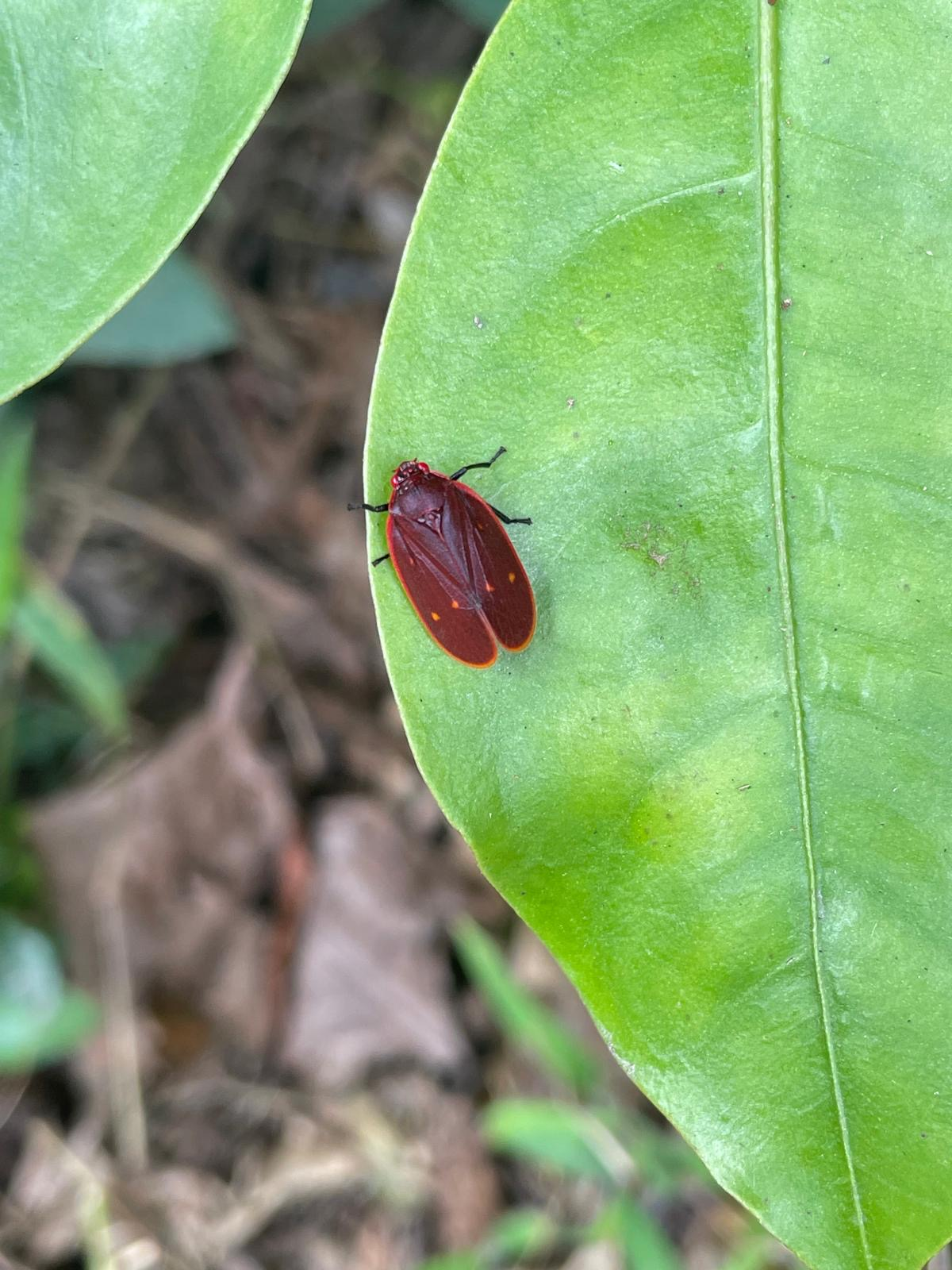
- Iphirhina quota on a leaf

Scientific classification
- Kingdom: Animalia
- Phylum: Arthropoda
- Class: Insecta
- Order: Hemiptera
- Suborder: Auchenorrhyncha
- Family: Ischnorhinidae
- Genus: Iphirhina; Fennah, 1968

= Iphirhina =

Genus of froghoppers

Iphirhina is a genus of froghoppers in the family Ischnorhinidae, formerly treated as a subfamily of Cercopidae (spittlebugs). The genus was first described by Fennah in 1968.

== Distribution and ecology ==
Species of Iphirhina occur in the Neotropical region, with most records from Costa Rica and surrounding areas. They are typically found in humid forests, often resting on leaves.

== Description ==
Like other froghoppers, members of this genus have stout bodies and strong hind legs adapted for jumping. Some species show bright or contrasting wing patterns, such as yellow spots or bordered markings.
