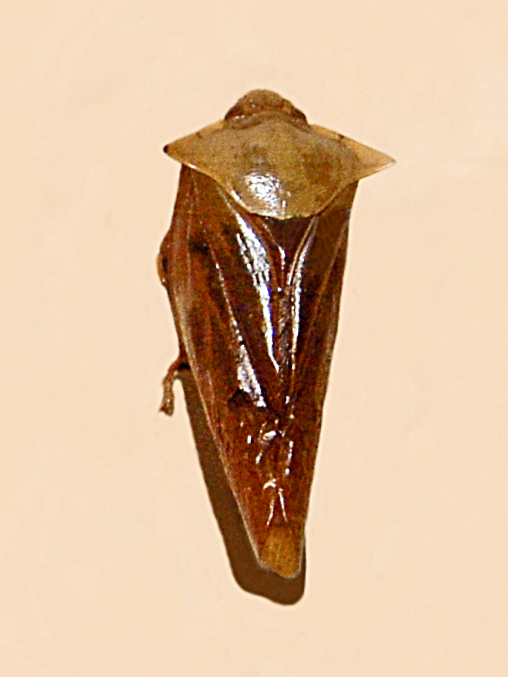
- Leptataspis acuta from Sumatra

Scientific classification
- Kingdom: Animalia
- Phylum: Arthropoda
- Class: Insecta
- Order: Hemiptera
- Suborder: Auchenorrhyncha
- Family: Cercopidae
- Subfamily: Cosmoscartinae
- Genus: Leptataspis
- Species: L. acuta

Binomial name
- Leptataspis acuta Schmidt, 1910

= Leptataspis acuta =

Species of true bug

Leptataspis acuta is a species of froghoppers belonging to the family Cercopidae.

== Distribution ==
This species is present in Sumatra.
