= Aeneolamia flavilatera =

Scientific classification
- Kingdom: Animalia
- Phylum: Arthropoda
- Clade: Pancrustacea
- Class: Insecta
- Order: Hemiptera
- Suborder: Auchenorrhyncha
- Family: Ischnorhinidae
- Genus: Aeneolamia
- Species: A. flavilatera

Binomial name
- Aeneolamia flavilatera (Urich, 1914)

Synonyms
- Tomaspis flavilatera

Species of insect

Aeneolamia flavilatera is a species of insect from the genus Aeneolamia. It was first described by Urich in 1914. Two subspecies were described in 1956: A. flavilatera belenensis and A. flavilatera guarici.
