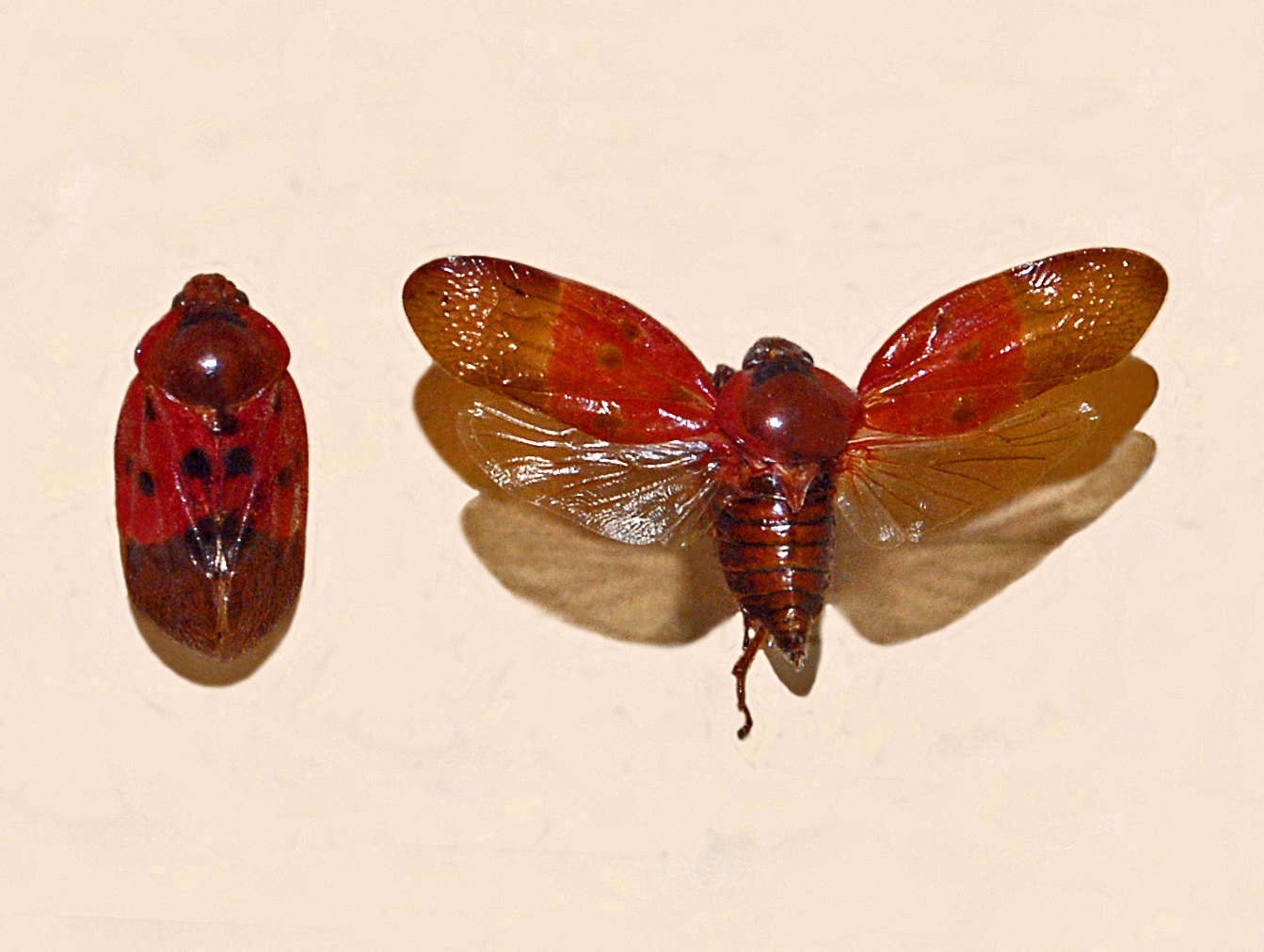
- Leptataspis discolor from New Guinea

Scientific classification
- Domain: Eukaryota
- Kingdom: Animalia
- Phylum: Arthropoda
- Class: Insecta
- Order: Hemiptera
- Suborder: Auchenorrhyncha
- Family: Cercopidae
- Genus: Leptataspis
- Species: L. discolor

Binomial name
- Leptataspis discolor (Boisduval, 1835)

Synonyms
- Cercopis discolor Boisduval, 1835; Cosmoscarta discolor (Boisduval, 1835)

= Leptataspis discolor =

Species of true bug

Leptataspis discolor is a species of froghoppers belonging to the family Cercopidae.

== Distribution ==
This species is present in Indonesia and Papua New Guinea.
