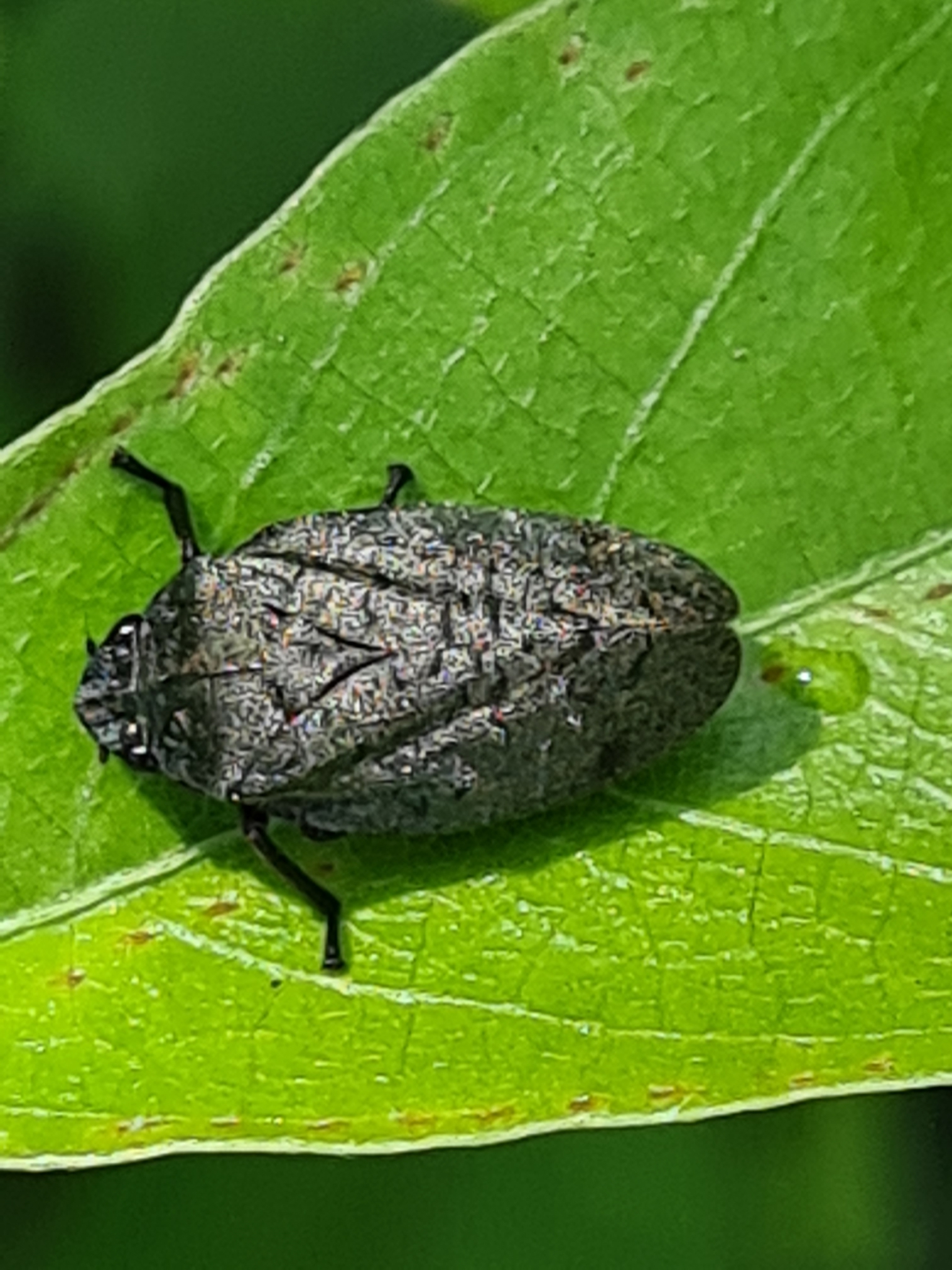

Scientific classification
- Domain: Eukaryota
- Kingdom: Animalia
- Phylum: Arthropoda
- Class: Insecta
- Order: Hemiptera
- Suborder: Auchenorrhyncha
- Family: Ischnorhinidae
- Genus: Zulia
- Species: Z. pubescens

Binomial name
- Zulia pubescens (Fabricius, 1803)

= Zulia pubescens =

Species of insect

Zulia pubescens is a species from the genus Zulia.
