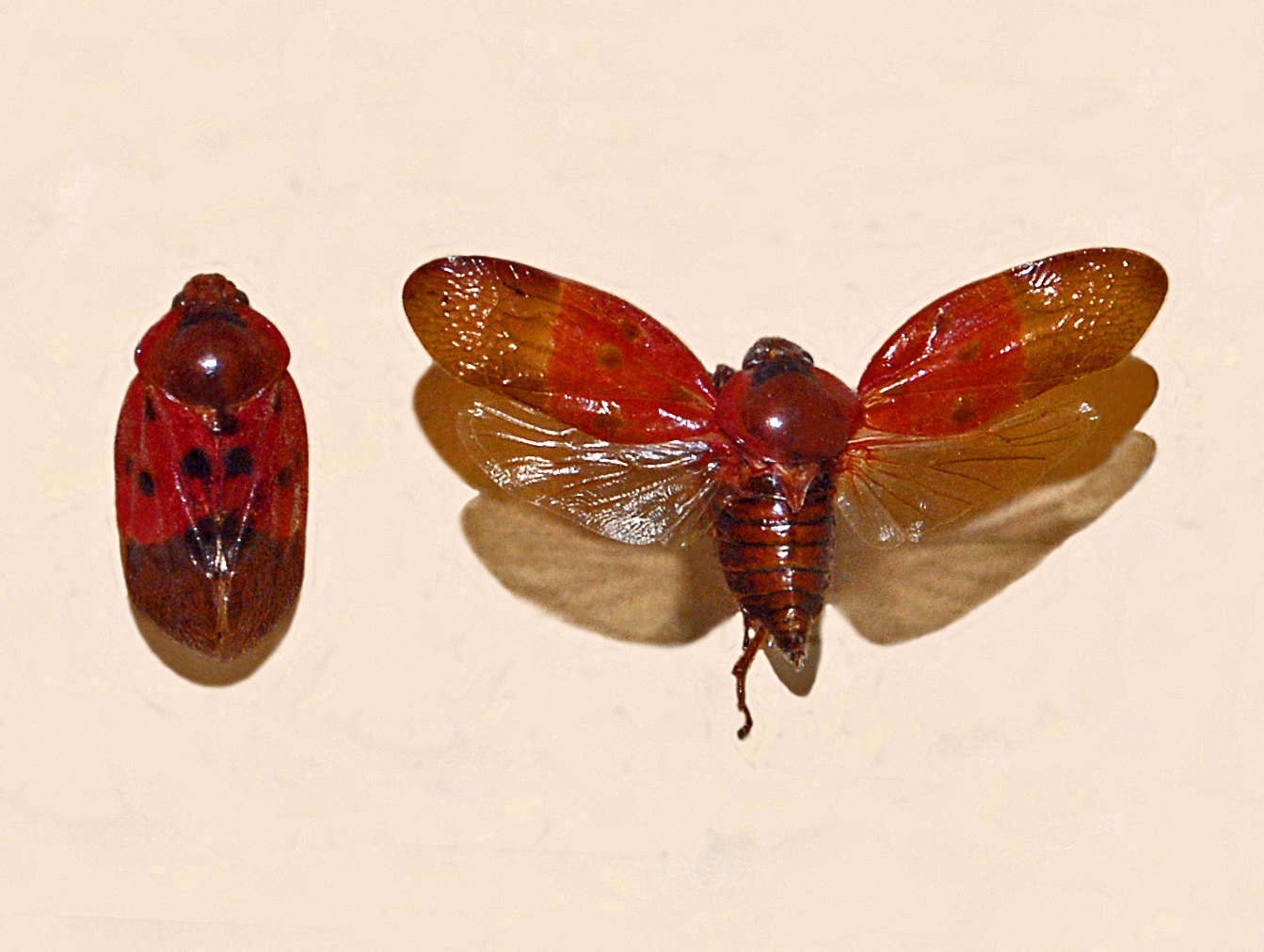
- Leptataspis discolor

Scientific classification
- Domain: Eukaryota
- Kingdom: Animalia
- Phylum: Arthropoda
- Class: Insecta
- Order: Hemiptera
- Suborder: Auchenorrhyncha
- Family: Cercopidae
- Subfamily: Cosmoscartinae
- Genus: Leptataspis; Schmidt, 1910

= Leptataspis =

Genus of true bugs

Leptataspis is a genus of Asian froghoppers belonging to the family Cercopidae and tribe Suracartini.

== Species ==
Leptataspis includes:

- Leptataspis acuta Schmidt, 1910
- Leptataspis aglaie (Breddin, 1902)
- Leptataspis alahana Jacobi, 1921
- Leptataspis amoena Lallemand, 1928
- Leptataspis angulosa (Stål, 1869)
- Leptataspis apicata Lallemand, 1922
- Leptataspis bansaina Lallemand, 1927
- Leptataspis barda Schmidt, 1911
- Leptataspis beatifica Schmidt, 1911
- Leptataspis bipars (Walker, 1858)
- Leptataspis borneensis Schmidt, 1911
- Leptataspis briseis (Breddin, 1903)
- Leptataspis bukidnona Lallemand, 1923
- Leptataspis butuanensis Lallemand, 1923
- Leptataspis cambodjana Schmidt, 1911
- Leptataspis cassandra (Breddin, 1903)
- Leptataspis chloe Jacobi, 1921
- Leptataspis cincta Lallemand & Synave, 1955
- Leptataspis clio Jacobi, 1921
- Leptataspis collaris Lallemand, 1922
- Leptataspis concinna Lallemand, 1939
- Leptataspis concolor (Walker, 1851)
- Leptataspis costalis Schmidt, 1911
- Leptataspis cyclopiana Lallemand & Synave, 1955
- Leptataspis discolor (Boisduval, 1835)
- Leptataspis diversa Schmidt, 1927
- Leptataspis electa Lallemand, 1928
- Leptataspis elegantula Distant, 1914
- Leptataspis eurydice (Breddin, 1903)
- Leptataspis euterpe Jacobi, 1921
- Leptataspis flavomarginata Schmidt, 1927
- Leptataspis formosula Schmidt, 1911
- Leptataspis fornax Schmidt, 1911
- Leptataspis fortunata Schmidt, 1911
- Leptataspis fruhstorferi Schmidt, 1927
- Leptataspis fulviceps (Dallas, 1850)
- Leptataspis fulvicollis (Walker, 1851)
- Leptataspis fuscipennis (Le Peletier de Saint-Fargeau & Serville, 1825)
- Leptataspis guttatiformis Schmidt, 1911
- Leptataspis hecuba Distant, 1914
- Leptataspis helena (Breddin, 1903)
- Leptataspis hendersoni Lallemand, 1930
- Leptataspis horsfieldi (Distant, 1900)
- Leptataspis horvathi Jacobi, 1921
- Leptataspis impressa (Walker, 1870)
- Leptataspis inclusa (Walker, 1851)
- Leptataspis insularis Lallemand, 1927
- Leptataspis intermedia Schmidt, 1912
- Leptataspis kiangensis Lallemand, 1939
- Leptataspis latipennis (Jacobi, 1905)
- Leptataspis lemoulti Lallemand, 1956
- Leptataspis leonina (Distant, 1908)
- Leptataspis leoninella Schmidt, 1911
- Leptataspis lieftincki Lallemand, 1954
- Leptataspis limonias Jacobi, 1921
- Leptataspis lombokensis Jacobi, 1921
- Leptataspis longirostris Schmidt, 1911
- Leptataspis lutea Schmidt, 1911
- Leptataspis lydia (Stål, 1865)
- Leptataspis maheensis Lallemand, 1922
- Leptataspis malaisei Lallemand, 1954
- Leptataspis martha (Lallemand, 1911)
- Leptataspis masoni (Distant, 1879)
- Leptataspis matherana Lallemand, 1939
- Leptataspis medanensis Lallemand, 1923
- Leptataspis medea Breddin, 1903
- Leptataspis moorei (Distant, 1878)
- Leptataspis moultoni Lallemand, 1923
- Leptataspis muiri Lallemand, 1956
- Leptataspis murina Schmidt, 1910
- Leptataspis nigripennis (Fabricius, 1803)
- Leptataspis nigrolimbata Schmidt, 1910
- Leptataspis novaeguineae Lallemand, 1922
- Leptataspis ophir (Distant, 1900)
- Leptataspis ophirina Lallemand, 1930
- Leptataspis ornata Lallemand, 1939
- Leptataspis palawana Schmidt, 1911
- Leptataspis papua (Jacobi, 1905)
- Leptataspis papuensis (Butler, 1874)
- Leptataspis patagiata Lallemand, 1927
- Leptataspis peracuta Lallemand, 1928
- Leptataspis perakensis Lallemand, 1923
- Leptataspis phiale (Breddin, 1902)
- Leptataspis phialiforme Lallemand, 1922
- Leptataspis philippinensis Schmidt, 1920
- Leptataspis philomele (Breddin, 1903)
- Leptataspis pirollei Lallemand, 1912
- Leptataspis polyxena (Breddin, 1903)
- Leptataspis polyxenia Schmidt, 1910
- Leptataspis postcingulata Jacobi, 1921
- Leptataspis progne (Breddin, 1903)
- Leptataspis proserpinopsis Schmidt, 1911
- Leptataspis quadrinotata Lallemand, 1922
- Leptataspis quinqueguttata Jacobi, 1921
- Leptataspis robinsoni Lallemand, 1928
- Leptataspis rotundata (Walker, 1858)
- Leptataspis royeri Lallemand, 1922
- Leptataspis rubiana (Jacobi, 1905)
- Leptataspis rubrolimbata Lallemand, 1922
- Leptataspis rufimargo (Walker, 1870)
- Leptataspis rufipes (Stål, 1870)
- Leptataspis rugulosa (Walker, 1857)
- Leptataspis rutilans (Butler, 1874)
- Leptataspis sanguinea Lallemand, 1931
- Leptataspis sanguiniflua (Breddin, 1899)
- Leptataspis scabra (Distant, 1900)
- Leptataspis scabrida Schmidt, 1910
- Leptataspis schlaginhaufeni Jacobi, 1921
- Leptataspis selangorensis Lallemand, 1930
- Leptataspis semicincta (Walker, 1851)
- Leptataspis semipardalis (Walker, 1857)
- Leptataspis sempolana Lallemand, 1935
- Leptataspis siamensis (Butler, 1874)
- Leptataspis similis Schmidt, 1911
- Leptataspis specialis Lallemand, 1927
- Leptataspis striata Lallemand, 1922
- Leptataspis sumatrana Schmidt, 1911
- Leptataspis sumbana Schmidt, 1927
- Leptataspis testaceicollis Schmidt, 1911
- Leptataspis toxopei Lallemand & Synave, 1955
- Leptataspis trichinopolis Lallemand, 1922
- Leptataspis trifasciata Lallemand, 1927
- Leptataspis turana Lallemand, 1922
- Leptataspis walkeri Metcalf, 1961
