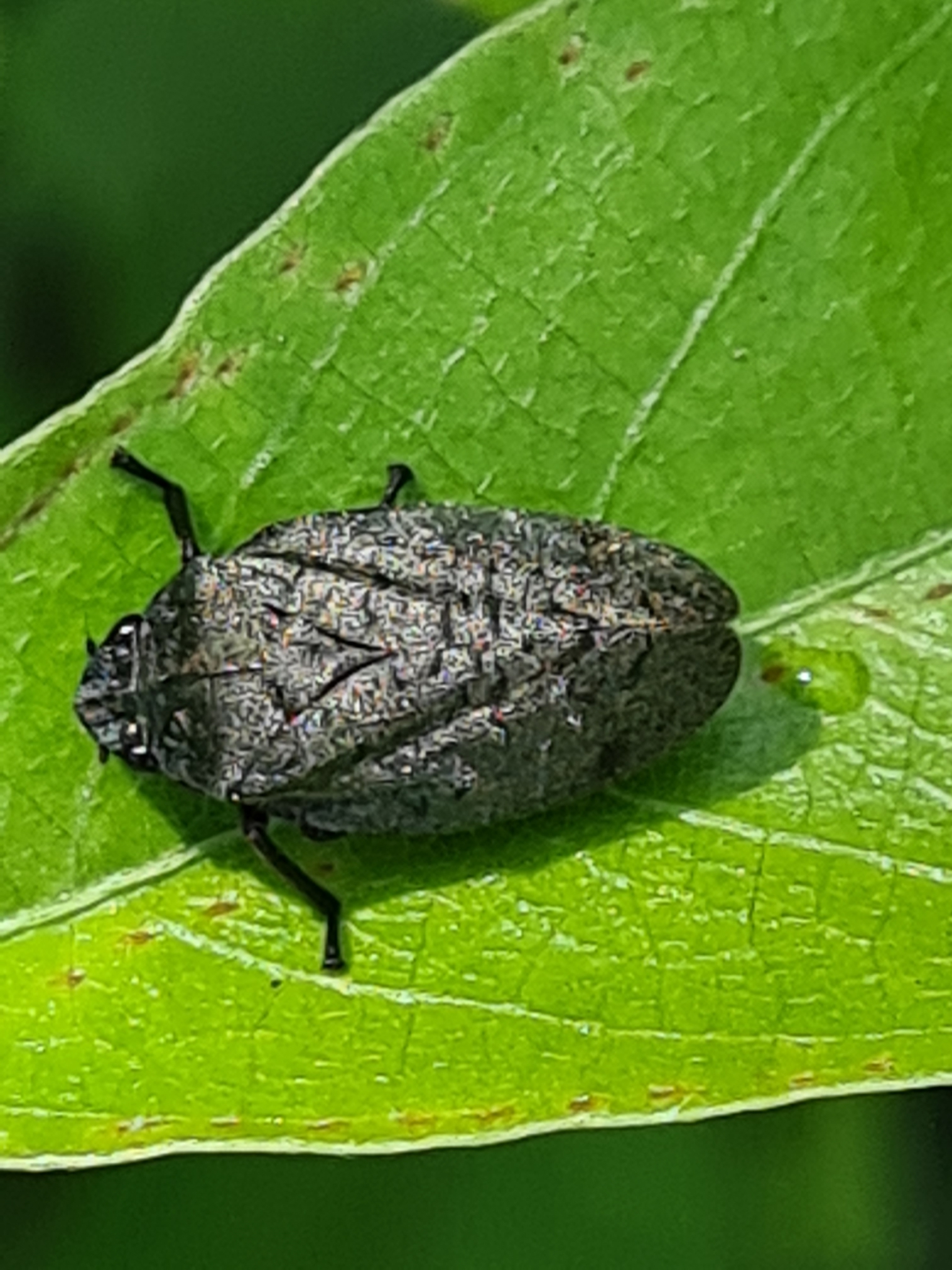
- Z. pubescens from Suriname

Scientific classification
- Kingdom: Animalia
- Phylum: Arthropoda
- Class: Insecta
- Order: Hemiptera
- Suborder: Auchenorrhyncha
- Family: Ischnorhinidae
- Tribe: Tomaspidini
- Genus: Zulia; Fennah, 1949

Type species
- Zulia pubescens (Fabricius, 1803)

Species
- See text

= Zulia (froghopper) =

Genus of froghoppers

Zulia is a genus of froghoppers in the family Ischnorhinidae. The genus was established by R. G. Fennah in 1949.

== Distribution ==
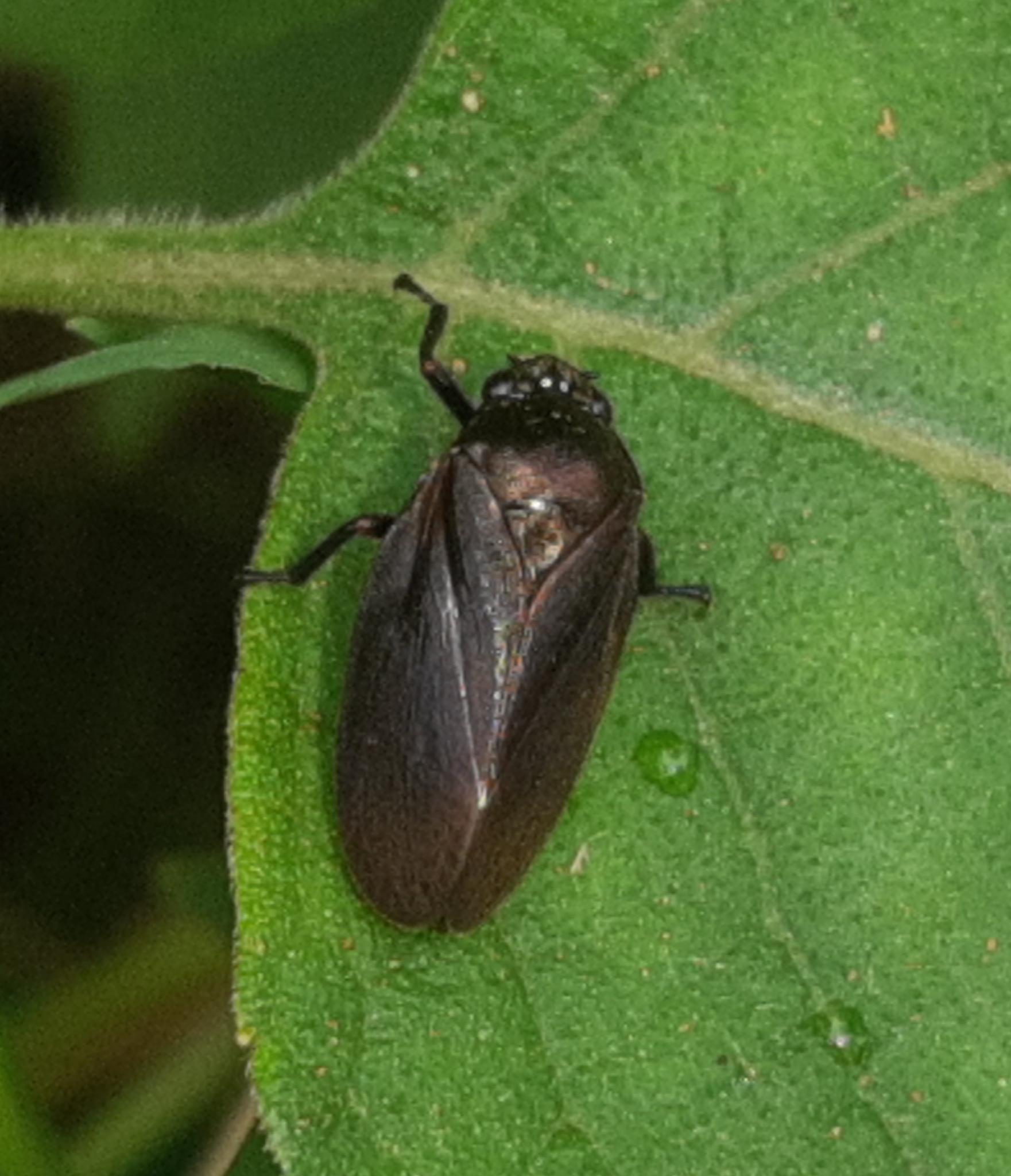
Z. vilior from Costa Rica

The genus Zulia is found in the Neotropical region, with species distributed from Mexico south to southern Brazil.

== Species ==
The genus contains at least eight described species:

- Zulia birubromaculata
- Zulia brunnea
- Zulia carbonaria (Lallemand)
- Zulia monticola
- Zulia morosa
- Zulia obscura
- Zulia pubescens (Fabricius, 1803) – type species
- Zulia vilior
