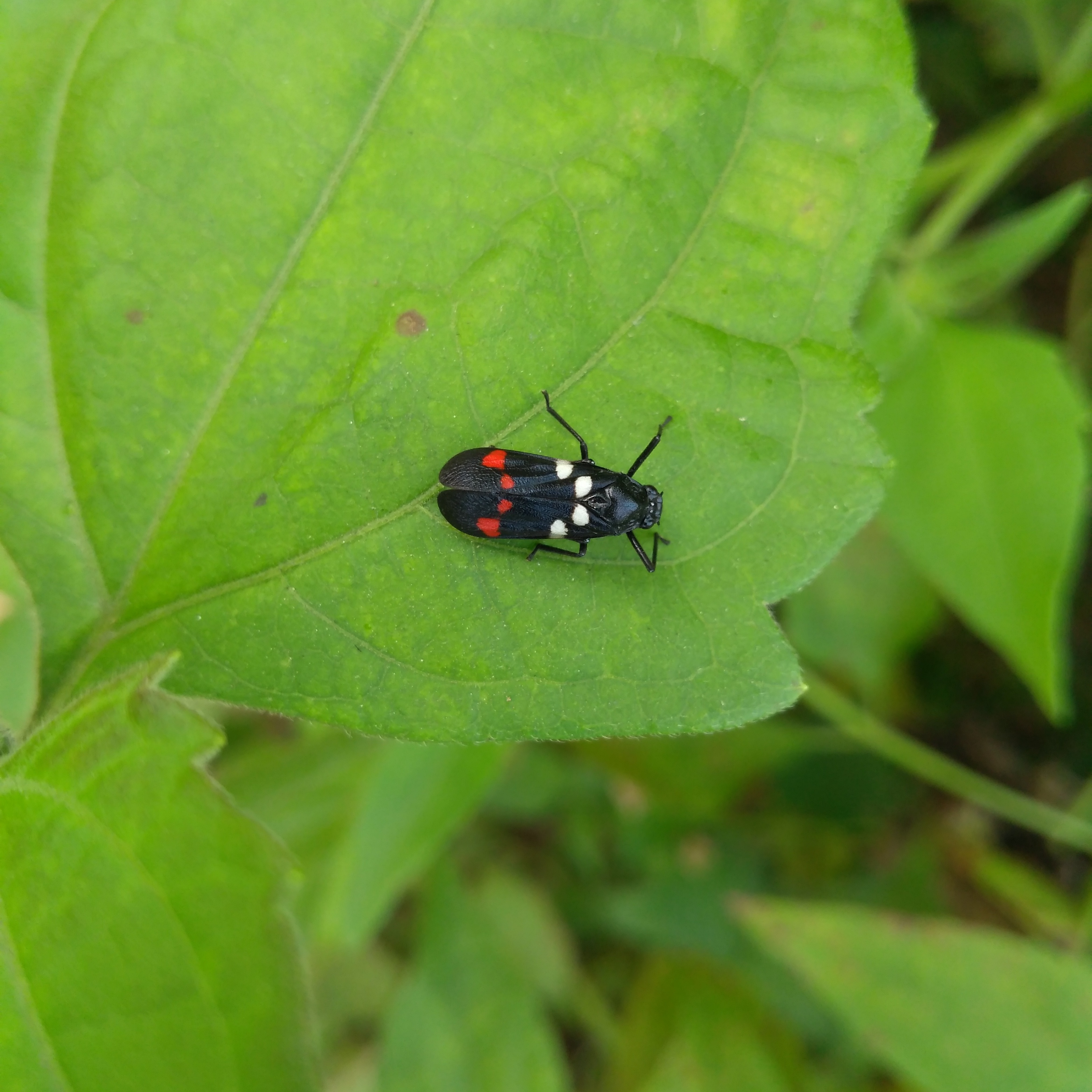
- Callitettix versicolor

Scientific classification
- Kingdom: Animalia
- Phylum: Arthropoda
- Clade: Pancrustacea
- Class: Insecta
- Order: Hemiptera
- Suborder: Auchenorrhyncha
- Family: Cercopidae
- Subfamily: Cercopinae
- Genus: Callitettix; Stål, 1865

= Callitettix =

Genus of insects

Callitettix is a genus of bugs in the family Cercopidae ("froghoppers") in the suborder Auchenorrhyncha and typical of the tribe Callitettigini. The recorded distribution for species is in mainland Asia: from India to southern China and Indochina.

== Species ==
BioLib includes the following species:

1. Callitettix biformis Lallemand, 1927
2. Callitettix braconoides (Walker, 1858) – type species
3. Callitettix carinifrons Noualhier, 1904
4. Callitettix contiguus (Walker, 1851)
5. Callitettix coomani Lallemand, 1946
6. Callitettix costalis Lallemand, 1933
7. Callitettix proximus (Walker, 1851)
8. Callitettix ruficeps Melichar, 1915
9. Callitettix versicolor (Fabricius, 1794)
