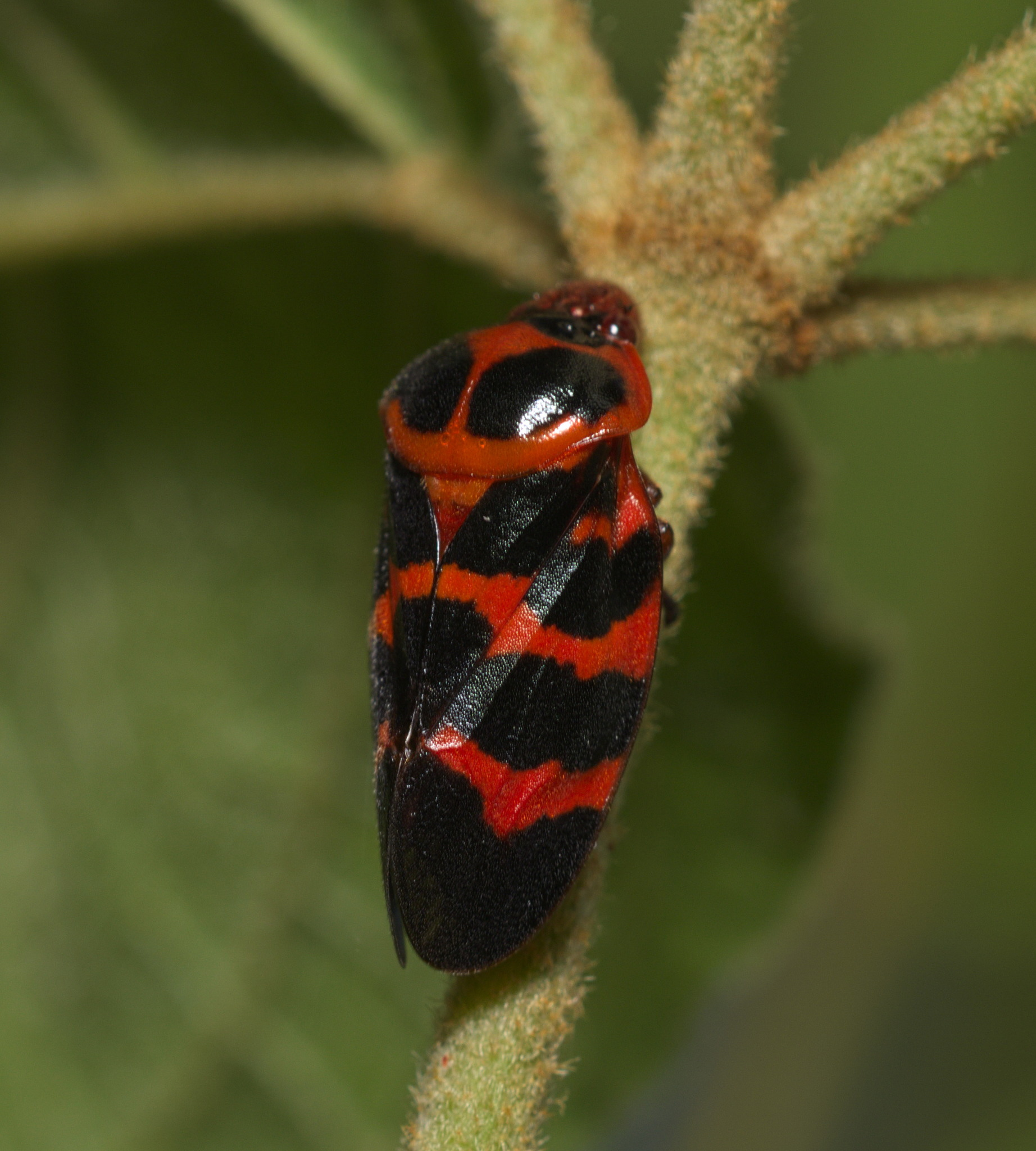
- Cosmoscarta bispecularis from Hong Kong

Scientific classification
- Domain: Eukaryota
- Kingdom: Animalia
- Phylum: Arthropoda
- Class: Insecta
- Order: Hemiptera
- Suborder: Auchenorrhyncha
- Family: Cercopidae
- Subfamily: Cosmoscartinae
- Genus: Cosmoscarta; Stål, 1869

Type species
- Cercopis heros Fabricius, 1803

= Cosmoscarta =

Genus of insects

Cosmoscarta is a genus of froghoppers found in the Indomalayan region. Many of the species are boldly marked in black and red or yellow. A few species are of economic importance as they can cause injury to plants under cultivation.

== Description ==
The genus was erected by Carl Stål on the basis of a large frons extending almost to the eyes and lacking any longitudinal furrows or keels. The hind tibia has a strong spine at the mid position and sometimes a smaller spine near the base. The related genus Phymatostetha has a narrower pronotum with the posterior margin straighter or with a sinuate margin before the scutellum.

Cosmoscarta dorsimacula is sometimes considered a pest on glutinous rice yam (Dioscorea alata). Cosmoscarta relata has been recorded in large numbers on jackfruit (Artocarpus heterophyllus).

== Species ==
This genus includes:

- Cosmoscarta abdominalis (Donovan, 1798)
- Cosmoscarta aerata Jacobi, 1905
- Cosmoscarta affinis (Atkinson, 1889)
- Cosmoscarta amabilis (Stål, 1865)
- Cosmoscarta amymone Breddin, 1900
- Cosmoscarta andamana Distant, 1878
- Cosmoscarta angulifera (Walker, 1870)
- Cosmoscarta apiana Lallemand, 1935
- Cosmoscarta arethusa Breddin, 1900
- Cosmoscarta assamensis Distant, 1914
- Cosmoscarta balteata Distant, 1914
- Cosmoscarta bicincta Lallemand, 1931
- Cosmoscarta bicolor Lallemand, 1922
- Cosmoscarta bimacula (Walker, 1851)
- Cosmoscarta bipunctata Schmidt, 1911
- Cosmoscarta bispecularis (White, 1844)
- Cosmoscarta boutharensis Lallemand, 1922
- Cosmoscarta brevis Schmidt, 1910
- Cosmoscarta brevistriga (Walker, 1870)
- Cosmoscarta bruneoscutellata Lallemand, 1927
- Cosmoscarta callirrhoe Breddin, 1901
- Cosmoscarta callizona Butler, 1874
- Cosmoscarta carens Noualhier, 1896
- Cosmoscarta carpentieri Lallemand, 1928
- Cosmoscarta castanea Distant, 1900
- Cosmoscarta celebesensis Lallemand, 1922
- Cosmoscarta chrysomelaena Butler, 1874
- Cosmoscarta concisa (Walker, 1870)
- Cosmoscarta confinis Schmidt, 1910
- Cosmoscarta consociata Distant, 1900
- Cosmoscarta contigua Lallemand, 1927
- Cosmoscarta convexa (Walker, 1870)
- Cosmoscarta coronis Jacobi, 1905
- Cosmoscarta decisa (Walker, 1858)
- Cosmoscarta dimidiata (Dallas, 1850)
- Cosmoscarta diminuta Lallemand, 1930
- Cosmoscarta dimota Schmidt, 1910
- Cosmoscarta discessa Schmidt, 1910
- Cosmoscarta discrepans (Walker, 1857)
- Cosmoscarta dorsalis (Walker, 1851)
- Cosmoscarta dorsimacula (Walker, 1851)
- Cosmoscarta dryope Breddin, 1900
- Cosmoscarta ducens (Walker, 1851)
- Cosmoscarta egens (Walker, 1858)
- Cosmoscarta egentior Lallemand, 1927
- Cosmoscarta egeria Schmidt, 1911
- Cosmoscarta elegantula Butler, 1874
- Cosmoscarta exultans (Walker, 1858)
- Cosmoscarta fictilis Butler, 1874
- Cosmoscarta flora Distant, 1908
- Cosmoscarta florella Metcalf, 1961
- Cosmoscarta forcipata Lallemand, 1939
- Cosmoscarta fumosa Distant, 1914
- Cosmoscarta fuscoapicalis Kato, 1928
- Cosmoscarta gracilis Schmidt, 1910
- Cosmoscarta gravelyi Distant, 1916
- Cosmoscarta greeni Atkinson, 1889
- Cosmoscarta hainanensis Jacobi, 1921
- Cosmoscarta hecuba Breddin, 1903
- Cosmoscarta heroina Distant, 1908
- Cosmoscarta herossa Jacobi, 1921
- Cosmoscarta himalayana Distant, 1914
- Cosmoscarta hyale Breddin, 1901
- Cosmoscarta hyalinipennis Distant, 1908
- Cosmoscarta ignifera Distant, 1900
- Cosmoscarta imrayi Distant, 1914
- Cosmoscarta inconspicua (Butler, 1874)
- Cosmoscarta indecisa Jacobi, 1921
- Cosmoscarta innominata Schmidt, 1910
- Cosmoscarta innota Schmidt, 1910
- Cosmoscarta insularis Lallemand, 1922
- Cosmoscarta irresoluta (Walker, 1858)
- Cosmoscarta lacerata (Walker, 1870)
- Cosmoscarta lateralis Jacobi, 1927
- Cosmoscarta laticincta (Walker, 1870)
- Cosmoscarta lestachei Lallemand, 1922
- Cosmoscarta leucothoe Breddin, 1903
- Cosmoscarta liriope Breddin, 1901
- Cosmoscarta luangana Lallemand, 1927
- Cosmoscarta lunata Distant, 1914
- Cosmoscarta macgillivrayi Distant, 1900
- Cosmoscarta maculifascia (Walker, 1870)
- Cosmoscarta mandarina Distant, 1900
- Cosmoscarta mandaru Distant, 1900
- Cosmoscarta margheritae Distant, 1908
- Cosmoscarta maura Distant, 1900
- Cosmoscarta metallica Distant, 1900
- Cosmoscarta miniata Haupt, 1918
- Cosmoscarta minor Atkinson, 1889
- Cosmoscarta mnemosyne Breddin, 1903
- Cosmoscarta montana Distant, 1900
- Cosmoscarta nagasana Distant, 1900
- Cosmoscarta naiteara Distant, 1900
- Cosmoscarta nexa (Walker, 1870)
- Cosmoscarta nigriceps Schmidt, 1911
- Cosmoscarta nigriventris Schmidt, 1910
- Cosmoscarta nigroguttata Stål, 1870
- Cosmoscarta nitidula Schmidt, 1911
- Cosmoscarta nycteis Jacobi, 1905
- Cosmoscarta nympha Distant, 1914
- Cosmoscarta ochraceicollis Schmidt, 1910
- Cosmoscarta orchymonti Lallemand, 1931
- Cosmoscarta orithyia Breddin, 1901
- Cosmoscarta pallida (Walker, 1851)
- Cosmoscarta palopona Lallemand, 1931
- Cosmoscarta peguensis Schmidt, 1910
- Cosmoscarta pellucida Butler, 1874
- Cosmoscarta perstrigata Butler, 1874
- Cosmoscarta pictilis (Stål, 1854)
- Cosmoscarta pirene Breddin, 1900
- Cosmoscarta prompta Schmidt, 1910
- Cosmoscarta pronotalis Distant, 1908
- Cosmoscarta psecas Breddin, 1901
- Cosmoscarta pulchella Butler, 1874
- Cosmoscarta putamara Distant, 1900
- Cosmoscarta raja Distant, 1900
- Cosmoscarta relata Distant, 1900
- Cosmoscarta rhanis Breddin, 1901
- Cosmoscarta rubromaculata Metcalf & Horton, 1934
- Cosmoscarta rubroscutellata Matsumura, 1907
- Cosmoscarta samudra Distant, 1908
- Cosmoscarta sanguinolenta Distant, 1900
- Cosmoscarta semimaculata Stål, 1870
- Cosmoscarta septempunctata (Walker, 1851)
- Cosmoscarta sequens (Walker, 1870)
- Cosmoscarta sexmaculata Stål, 1870
- Cosmoscarta shillongana Distant, 1908
- Cosmoscarta silpha Breddin, 1903
- Cosmoscarta siniphila Matsumura, 1942
- Cosmoscarta sulukensis Distant, 1900
- Cosmoscarta sumbawana Lallemand, 1922
- Cosmoscarta sundana Metcalf, 1955
- Cosmoscarta sylvestris Lallemand, 1931
- Cosmoscarta taprobanensis Atkinson, 1889
- Cosmoscarta thalia (Stål, 1861)
- Cosmoscarta thoracica Distant, 1900
- Cosmoscarta timorensis Butler, 1874
- Cosmoscarta tolina Lallemand, 1939
- Cosmoscarta trichodias Jacobi, 1902
- Cosmoscarta trifasciata Schmidt, 1910
- Cosmoscarta trigona (Walker, 1851)
- Cosmoscarta trimacula (Walker, 1851)
- Cosmoscarta turaja Distant, 1900
- Cosmoscarta vernalis Lallemand, 1928
- Cosmoscarta wallacei Butler, 1874
- Cosmoscarta whiteheadi Distant, 1900
- Cosmoscarta zonaria Distant, 1908
- Cosmoscarta zonata Butler, 1874
