= Poeciloterpa =

Scientific classification
- Kingdom: Animalia
- Phylum: Arthropoda
- Clade: Pancrustacea
- Class: Insecta
- Order: Hemiptera
- Suborder: Auchenorrhyncha
- Family: Cercopidae
- Subfamily: Cercopinae
- Genus: Poeciloterpa; Stål, 1870

Genus of true bugs

Poeciloterpa is a genus of froghoppers in the family Cercopidae. Endemic to the Philippines, there are about 13 described species in Poeciloterpa.

== Species ==
Poeciloterpa contains the following species:

- Poeciloterpa altissima Crispolon & Soulier-Perkins, sp. nov.
- Poeciloterpa atra Jacobi, 1927
- Poeciloterpa conica Crispolon & Soulier-Perkins, sp. nov.
- Poeciloterpa fusca Lallemand, 1927
- Poeciloterpa gapudi Crispolon & Yap, sp. nov.
- Poeciloterpa latipennis Schmidt, 1920
- Poeciloterpa mangkas Crispolon & Yap, sp. nov.
- Poeciloterpa minuta Lallemand, 1922
- Poeciloterpa montana Schmidt, 1927
- Poeciloterpa nigrolimbata Stål, 1870
- Poeciloterpa obscura Schmidt, 1927
- Poeciloterpa rufolimbata Schmidt, 1927
- Poeciloterpa unicolor Lallemand, 1922
