= Prosapia =

- Prosapia bicincta

Scientific classification
- Kingdom: Animalia
- Phylum: Arthropoda
- Clade: Pancrustacea
- Class: Insecta
- Order: Hemiptera
- Suborder: Auchenorrhyncha
- Infraorder: Cicadomorpha
- Superfamily: Cercopoidea
- Family: Ischnorhinidae
- Genus: Prosapia; Fennah, 1949

Genus of true bugs

Prosapia is a genus of froghoppers in the family Ischnorhinidae. There are about six described species in Prosapia. The genus is distributed in North and Central America, including the Caribbean.

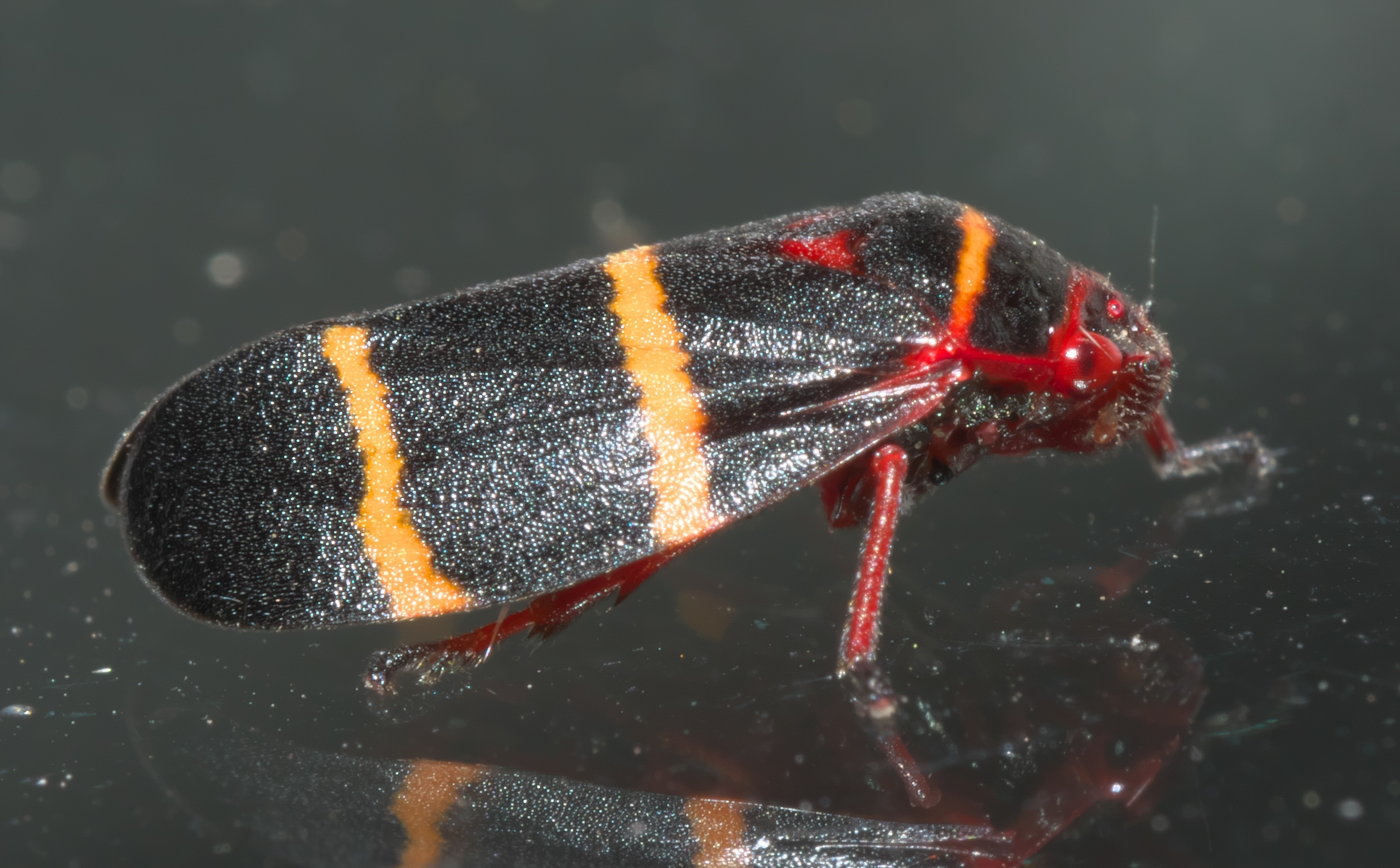
Prosapia bicincta

== Species ==
These six species belong to the genus Prosapia:

- Prosapia bicincta (Say, 1830)^{i c g b} (two-lined spittlebug)
- Prosapia flavifascia (Metcalf & Bruner, 1925)^{c g}
- Prosapia ignipectus (Fitch, 1851)^{i g b} (red-legged spittlebug)
- Prosapia latens Fennah, 1953^{c g}
- Prosapia plagiata (Distant, 1878)^{c g}
- Prosapia simulans (Walker, 1858)^{c g}

Data sources: i = ITIS, c = Catalogue of Life, g = GBIF, b = Bugguide.net
