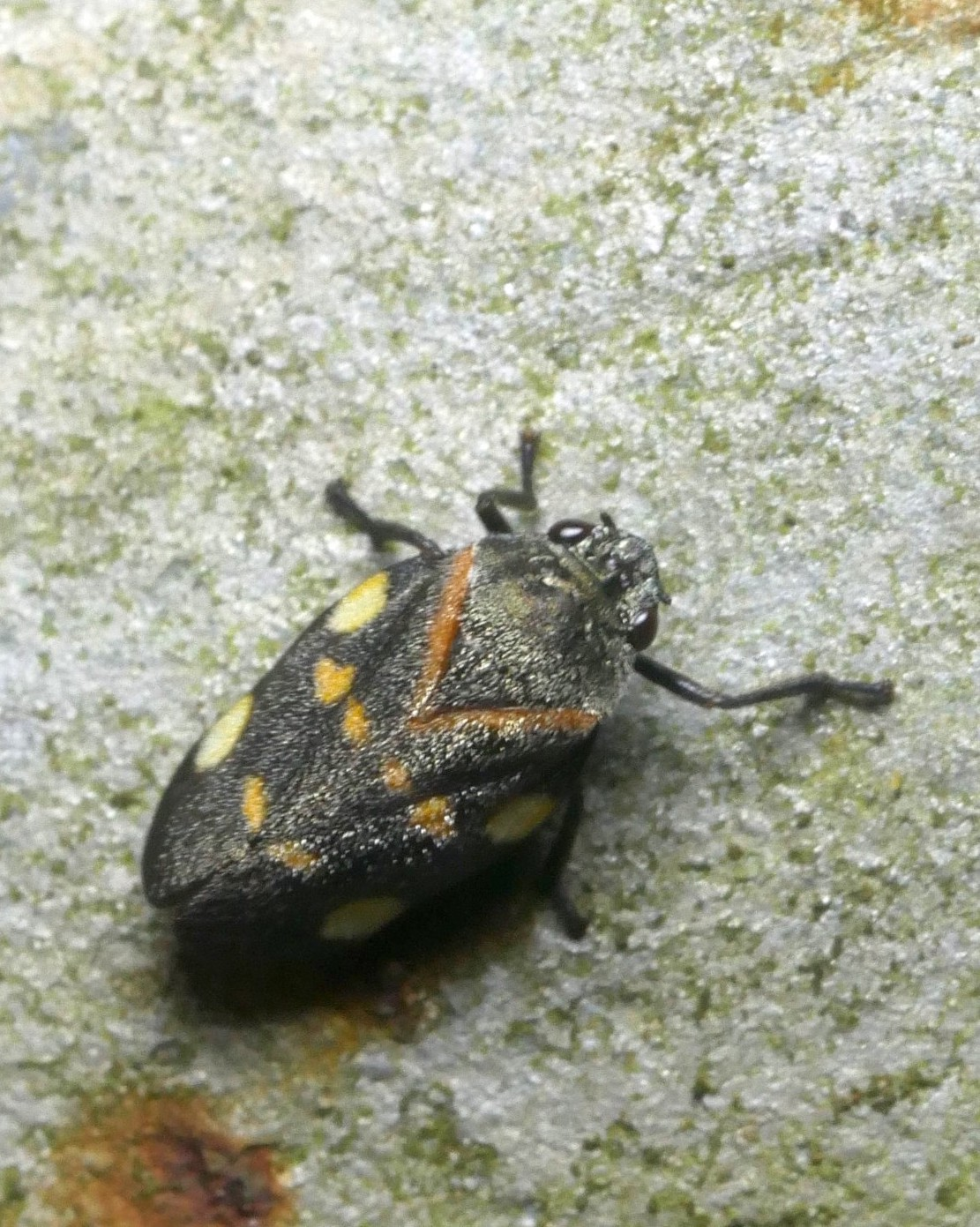
- Aeneolamia lepidior

Scientific classification
- Kingdom: Animalia
- Phylum: Arthropoda
- Clade: Pancrustacea
- Class: Insecta
- Order: Hemiptera
- Suborder: Auchenorrhyncha
- Infraorder: Cicadomorpha
- Superfamily: Cercopoidea
- Family: Ischnorhinidae
- Genus: Aeneolamia; Fennah, 1949

= Aeneolamia =

Genus of true bugs

Aeneolamia is a genus of Cicadomorpha in the froghopper family Ischnorhinidae. It is found mostly throughout Central America.

It consists of 8 species:

- Aeneolamia albofasciata
- Aeneolamia colon
- Aeneolamia contigua
- Aeneolamia flavilatera
- Aeneolamia lepidior
- Aeneolamia reducta
- Aeneolamia sanguiniplaga
- Aeneolamia varia
