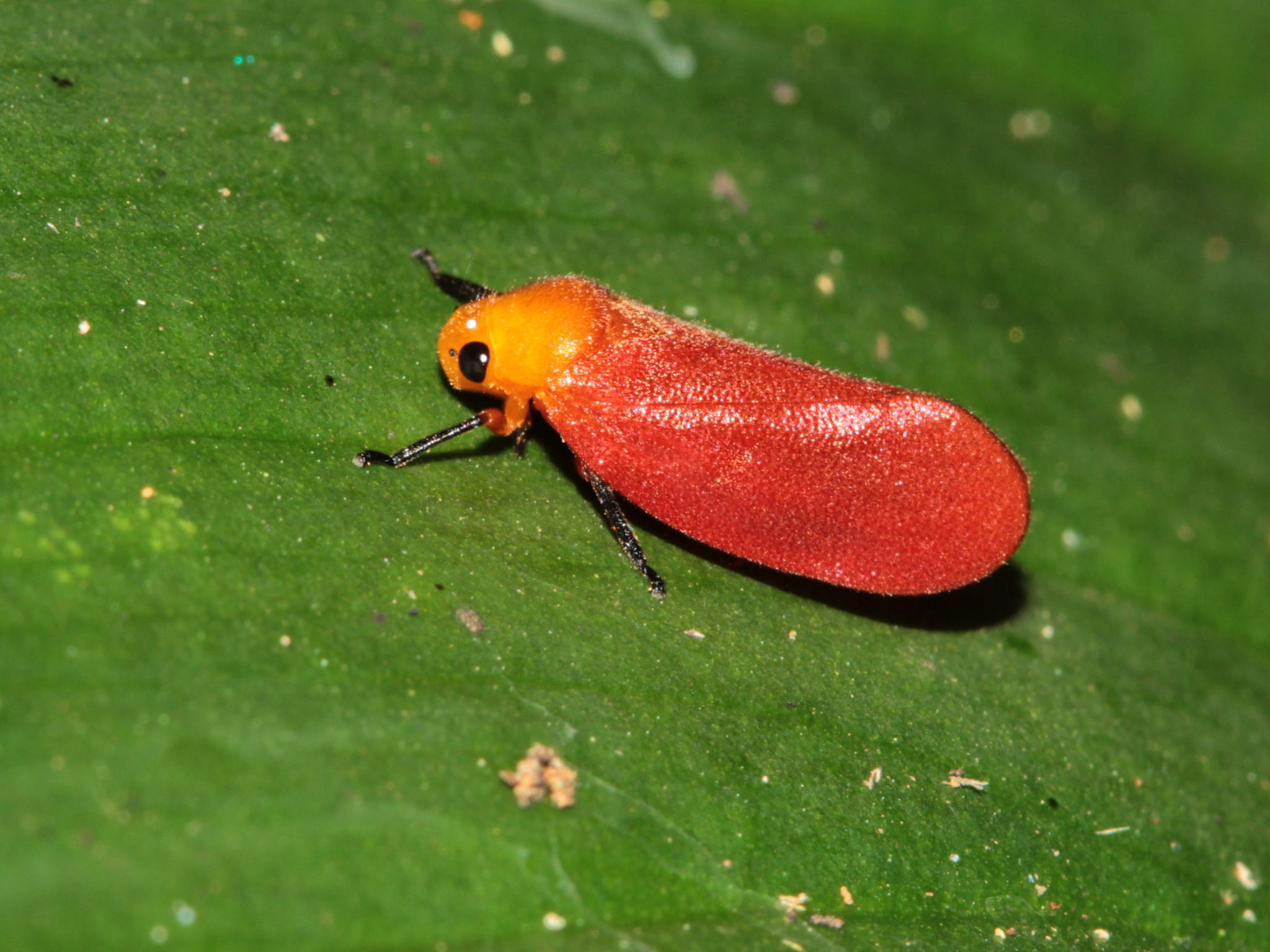
- Eoscarta borealis

Scientific classification
- Domain: Eukaryota
- Kingdom: Animalia
- Phylum: Arthropoda
- Class: Insecta
- Order: Hemiptera
- Suborder: Auchenorrhyncha
- Family: Cercopidae
- Subfamily: Cercopinae
- Genus: Eoscarta; Breddin, 1902

Type species
- Eoscarta eos Breddin, 1902

Synonyms
- Vigilantius Distant, 1916; Eocarta Jacobi, 1921 (Missp.); Goscarta Schmidt, 1925 (Missp.); Roscarta Lallemand, 1930 (Missp.); Keducarta Schmidt, 1931; Keduscarta Lallemand, 1933 (Missp.); Pseudeoscarta Lallemand, 1933; †Eoscartoides Matsumura, 1940; Eoscartopsis Matsumura, 1940; Pseudoscarta Neave, 1940 (Missp.); Esocarta Matsumura, 1940 (Missp.); Euthiaeoscarta Lallemand, 1949; Hemieoscarta Lallemand, 1949; Paraeoscarta Lallemand, 1949; Pseudoeoscarta Lallemand, 1949 (Missp.)

= Eoscarta =

Genus of insects

Eoscarta is a genus of froghopper (Cercopidae) with about 50 species distributed in the Oriental region. Species in the genus are identified by a combination of characters that include an elongated pubescent body, highly laterally compressed postclypeus, the hind tibia with a single lateral spur and genital characters of the males.

The genus has been treated widely differently by different workers and is closely related to several other genera like Euryaulax. Species that have been placed in the genus include:

- Eoscarta apicata Distant, 1908
- Eoscarta assimilis (Uhler, 1896)
- Eoscarta atricapilla Distant, 1908
- Eoscarta aurora Kirkaldy, 1909
- Eoscarta binotata Liang, 1996
- Eoscarta borealis (Distant, 1878)
- Eoscarta carnifex (Fabricius, 1775)
- Eoscarta colona Jacobi, 1927
- Eoscarta deprivata Walker, 1858
- Eoscarta elongata (Matsumura, 1940)
- Eoscarta eos Breddin, 1902
- Eoscarta ferruginea Distant, 1916
- Eoscarta fuscata Distant, 1916
- Eoscarta illuminata Distant, 1908
- Eoscarta inclyta (Walker)
- Eoscarta jugalis Lallemand, 1949
- Eoscarta karschi Schmidt, 1920
- Eoscarta limbipennis Jacobi, 1905
- Eoscarta liternoides Breddin, 1902
- Eoscarta lombokensis Metcalf, 1955
- Eoscarta lumuensis Lallemand, 1932
- Eoscarta marginiceps Melichar, 1914
- Eoscarta monticola Lallemand, 1928
- Eoscarta nilgiriensis Distant, 1900
- Eoscarta nobilis Lallemand, 1924
- Eoscarta ochraceous (Metcalf & Horton, 1934)
- Eoscarta parva Liang, 1996
- Eoscarta philippinica Lallemand, 1949
- Eoscarta rana Distant, 1909
- Eoscarta seimundi Lallemand, 1933
- Eoscarta spenceri Liang, 1996
- Eoscarta subdolens Walker, 1857
- Eoscarta tonkinensis Lallemand, 1949
- Eoscarta zonalis (Matsumura, 1907)
