= Chocontá =

- Municipality and town
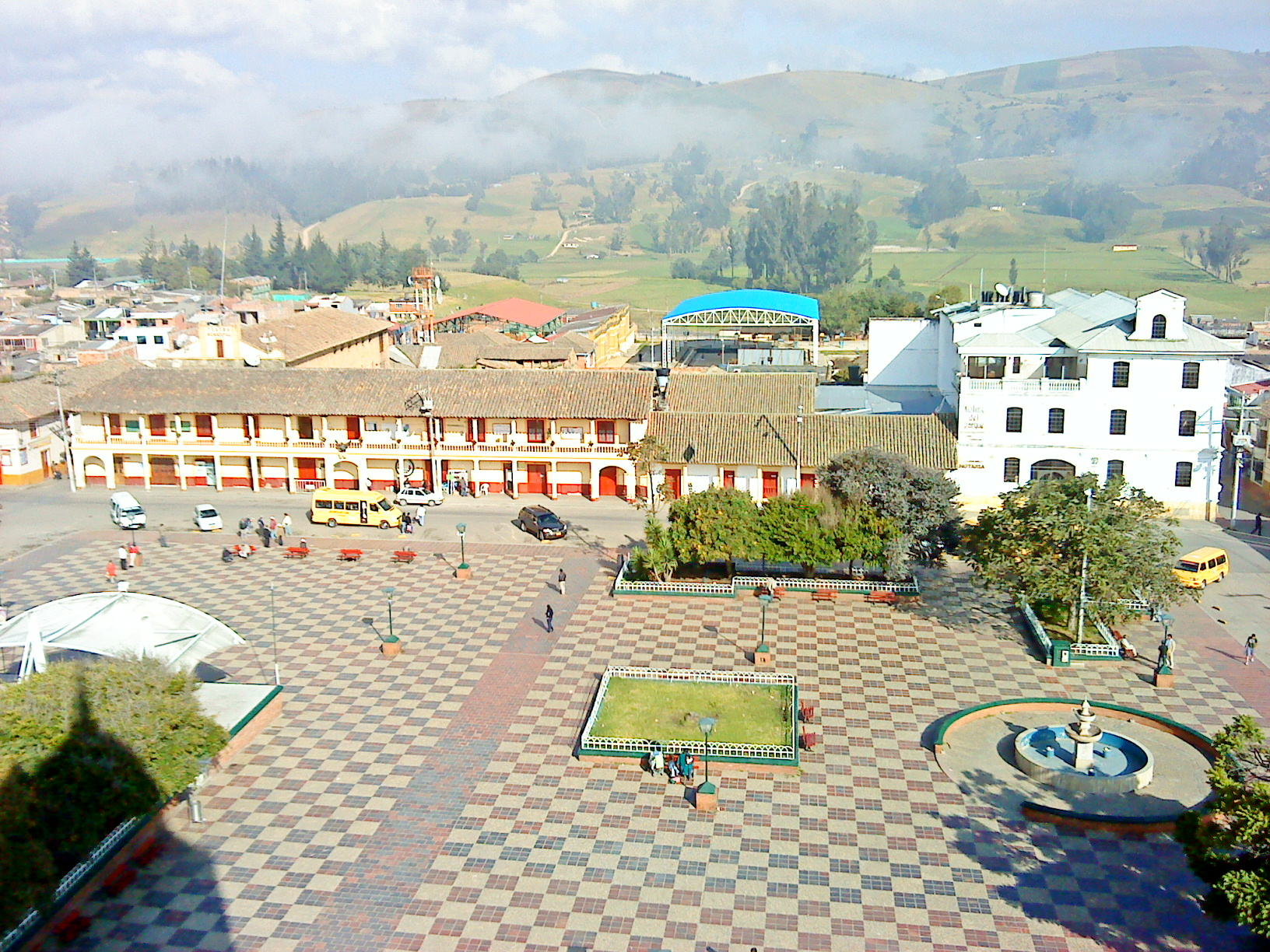
- Main square of Chocontá

- Flag Seal

- Location of the municipality and town inside Cundinamarca Department of Colombia

- Location in Colombia
- Coordinates: 5°8′48″N 73°40′57″W
- Country: Colombia
- Department: Cundinamarca
- Province: Almeidas Province
- Founded: 6 September 1563
- Founder: Tómas López

Government
  - Mayor: Jorge Enrique Pinzón Pinzón (2016–2019)

Area
  - Municipality and town: 300.2 km^{2} (115.9 sq mi)
  - Urban: 1.58 km^{2} (0.61 sq mi)
- Elevation: 2,655 m (8,711 ft)

Population (2018 census)
  - Municipality and town: 20,568
  - Density: 68.51/km^{2} (177.5/sq mi)
  - Urban: 10,554
  - Urban density: 6,680/km^{2} (17,300/sq mi)
- Time zone: UTC-5 (Colombia Standard Time)
- Website: Official website

Chocontá is a municipality and town of Colombia in the Almeidas Province, part of the department of Cundinamarca. It is located on the Pan-American Highway. In 1938 Chocontá had a population of 2,041.

== Etymology ==
In the Chibcha language of the Muisca, Chocontá means: "Farmlands of the good ally" or "Garden of the neighbour".

== History ==
Chocontá is located in the territories of the Muisca on the border between the area led by the cacique of Vélez and the southern Muisca zipazgo reign. Around 1490 the armies of the northern Muisca led by Michuá and the warriors of the southern Muisca ruled by Saguamanchica confronted each other in the bloody Battle of Chocontá.

The Spanish conquistadors led by Gonzalo Jiménez de Quesada reached the Colombian highlands in 1537. On 9 June 1537, Pentecostal day, the Spanish arrived in Chocontá and Father Fray Domingo de las Casas named it Pueblo del Espíritu Santo ("Town of the Holy Spirit") with a mass. The village was founded by Tómas López on 6 September 1563 and relocated in 1573.

In 1854 the presidential headquarters was located in Chocontá and on 21 April 1854 Tomás de Herrera was proclaimed president in the rectory of the town. On 9 August 1819 at 2 pm liberator Simón Bolívar arrived to Chocontá and stayed to rest in what currently is the House of Culture after his triumph, defining the fate of the Colombian Republic.

== Trivia ==
- Chocontá is the principal producer of strawberries in Colombia
- The town is nicknamed La ciudad satélite de Colombia ("The satellite town of Colombia") because of the satellite dishes of Telecom
- The Sisga Reservoir is located within Chocontá
- The genus Choconta with species Choconta circulata, found near Bogotá, have been named after Chocontá

== Climate ==
Climate data for Chocontá (Silos), elevation 2,709 m (8,888 ft), (1981–2010)
Month	Jan	Feb	Mar	Apr	May	Jun	Jul	Aug	Sep	Oct	Nov	Dec	Year
Mean daily maximum °C (°F)	18.2 (64.8)	18.4 (65.1)	18.4 (65.1)	17.6 (63.7)	17.0 (62.6)	15.7 (60.3)	15.1 (59.2)	15.7 (60.3)	16.5 (61.7)	17.2 (63.0)	17.5 (63.5)	17.7 (63.9)	17.1 (62.8)
Daily mean °C (°F)	12.0 (53.6)	12.5 (54.5)	12.8 (55.0)	12.8 (55.0)	12.6 (54.7)	11.9 (53.4)	11.4 (52.5)	11.6 (52.9)	11.9 (53.4)	12.4 (54.3)	12.6 (54.7)	12.2 (54.0)	12.2 (54.0)
Mean daily minimum °C (°F)	6.6 (43.9)	7.6 (45.7)	8.2 (46.8)	9.0 (48.2)	9.1 (48.4)	8.9 (48.0)	8.5 (47.3)	8.5 (47.3)	7.9 (46.2)	8.2 (46.8)	8.4 (47.1)	7.3 (45.1)	8.2 (46.8)
Average precipitation mm (inches)	17.6 (0.69)	38.9 (1.53)	58.3 (2.30)	87.8 (3.46)	119.9 (4.72)	129.2 (5.09)	144.3 (5.68)	107.4 (4.23)	70.0 (2.76)	77.6 (3.06)	61.6 (2.43)	24.6 (0.97)	937.3 (36.90)
Average precipitation days	7	9	13	18	23	25	25	23	18	17	16	9	202
Average relative humidity (%)	83	83	84	87	88	90	91	90	87	86	86	85	87
Mean monthly sunshine hours	204.6	163.7	145.7	111.0	114.7	75.0	96.1	108.5	123.0	133.3	138.0	182.9	1,596.5
Mean daily sunshine hours	6.6	5.8	4.7	3.7	3.7	2.5	3.1	3.5	4.1	4.3	4.6	5.9	4.4
Source: Instituto de Hidrologia Meteorologia y Estudios Ambientales

== Gallery ==
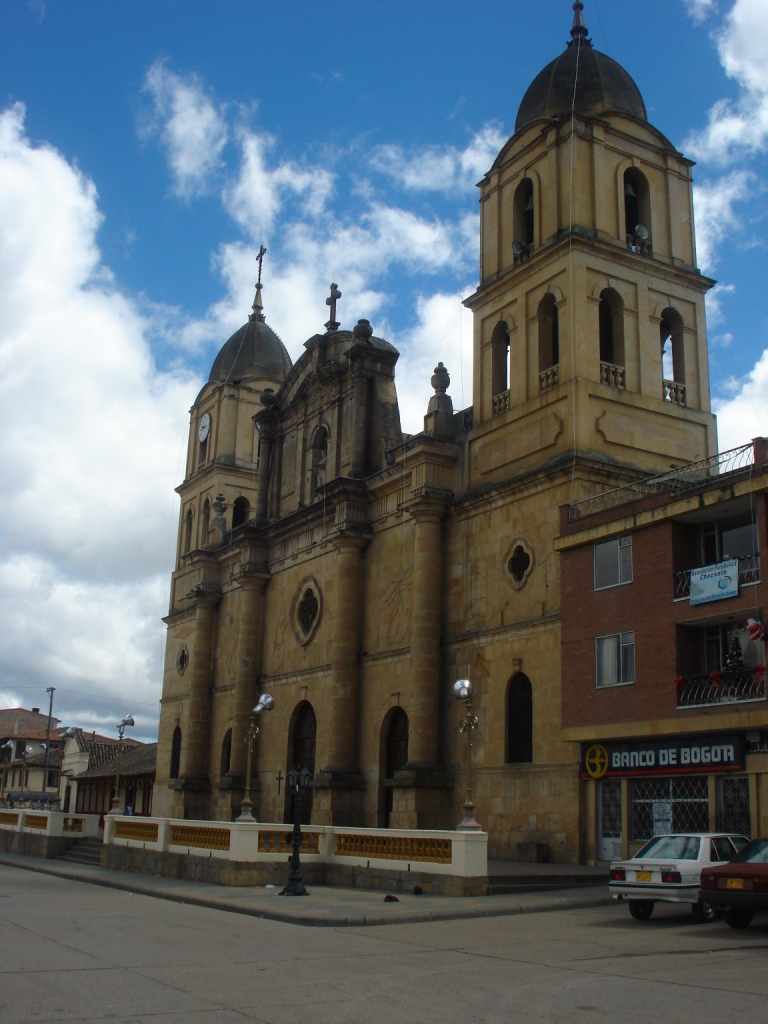
Church

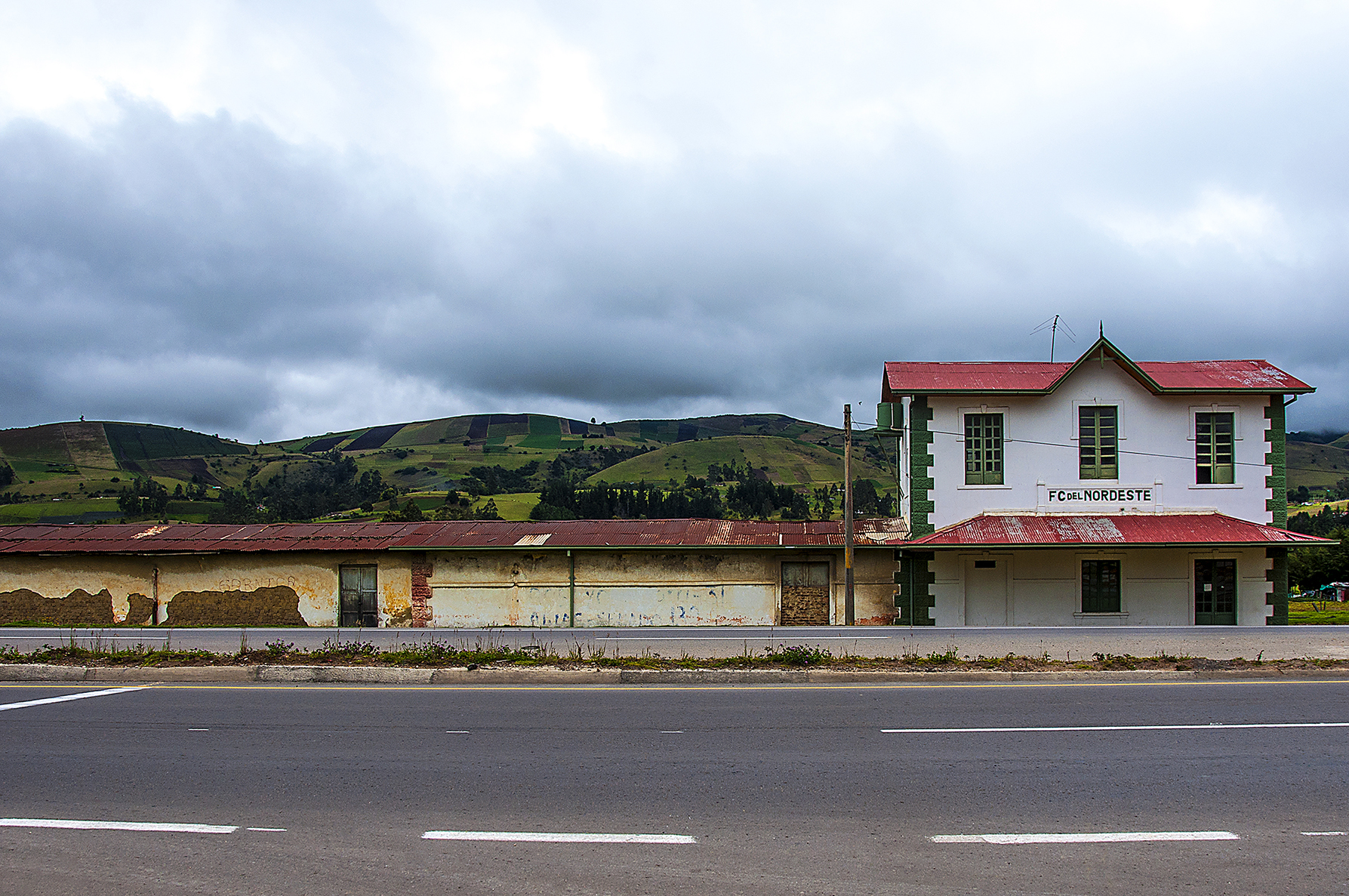
Train station Chocontá

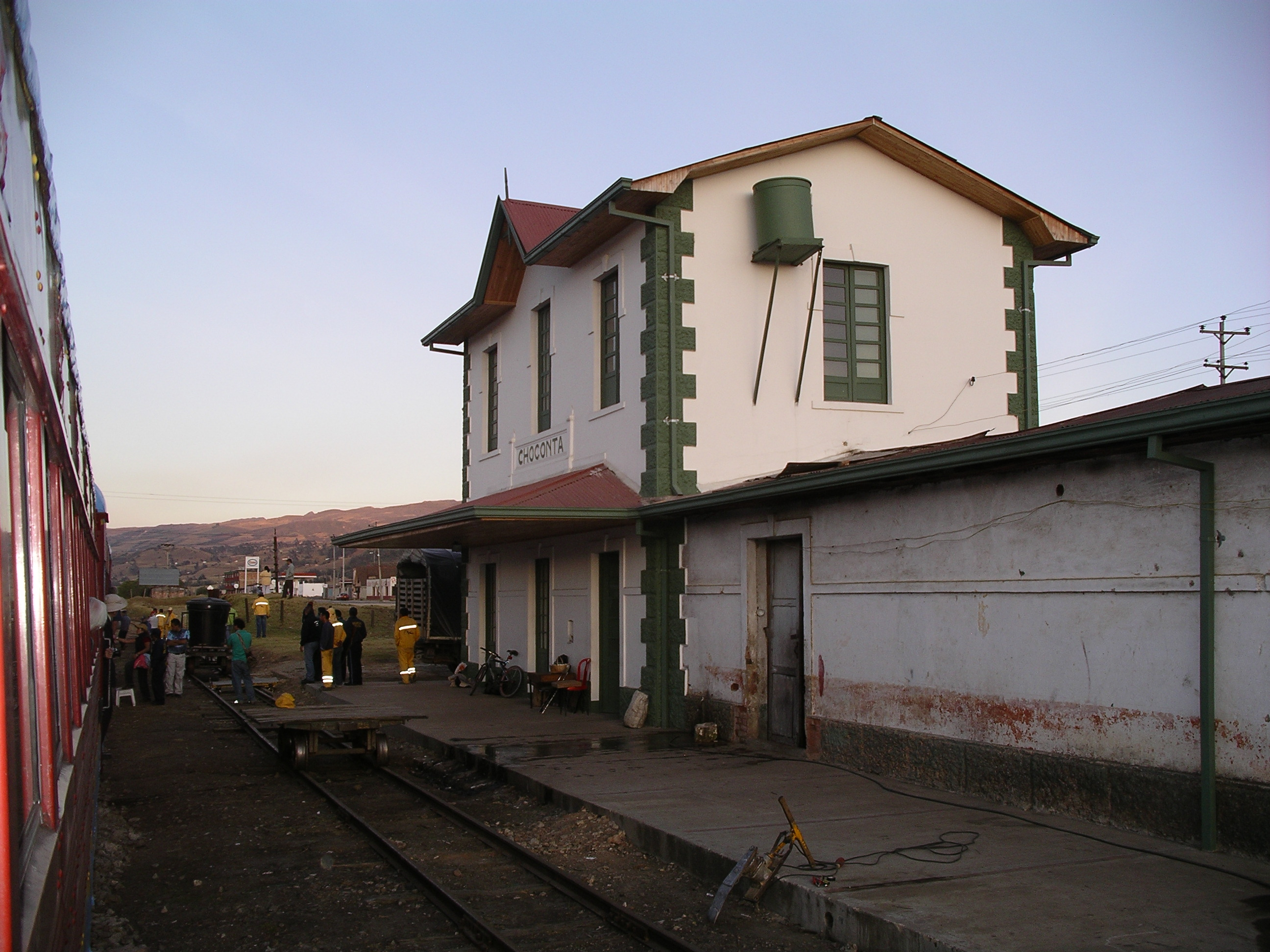
Train station
