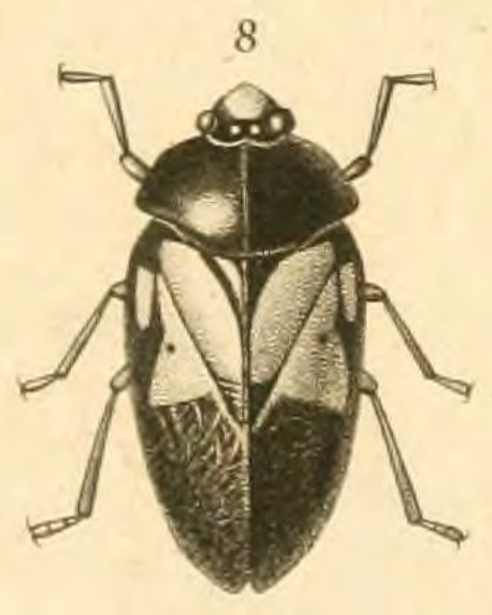
- Choconta circulata

Scientific classification
- Domain: Eukaryota
- Kingdom: Animalia
- Phylum: Arthropoda
- Class: Insecta
- Order: Hemiptera
- Suborder: Auchenorrhyncha
- Infraorder: Cicadomorpha
- Superfamily: Cercopoidea
- Family: Ischnorhinidae
- Genus: Choconta; Fennah, 1979

Species
- Choconta circulata (Guérin-Méneville, 1844); Choconta comitata (Melichar, 1915); Choconta elliptica (Walker, 1851); Choconta juno (Distant, 1909); Choconta peruana (Lallemand, 1924)

= Choconta (froghopper) =

Genus of true bugs

Choconta is a genus of froghoppers in the family Ischnorhinidae. The genus was described first by Fennah in 1979.

== Etymology and habitat ==
The genus is named after the town of Chocontá, Cundinamarca, on the Altiplano Cundiboyacense, Colombia. Its species are endemic to Colombia, Venezuela, Bolivia, and Peru.
