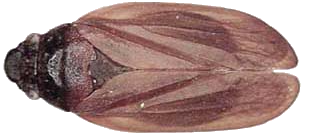
- Kanaima katzensteinii

Scientific classification
- Kingdom: Animalia
- Phylum: Arthropoda
- Clade: Pancrustacea
- Class: Insecta
- Order: Hemiptera
- Suborder: Auchenorrhyncha
- Family: Ischnorhinidae
- Subfamily: Ischnorhininae
- Tribe: Tomaspidini
- Genus: Kanaima; Distant, 1909

Synonyms
- Pachypterinella Lallemand, 1927

= Kanaima (froghopper) =

Genus of true bugs

Kanaima is a genus of froghoppers the family Ischnorhinidae. Species of the genus are found in Brazil & Argentina.

== Species ==
- Kanaima katzensteinii (Berg, 1879)
- Kanaima fluvialis (Lallemand, 1924)
- Kanaima fusca (Lallemand, 1927)
- Kanaima nigra Paladini & Carvalho, 2008
