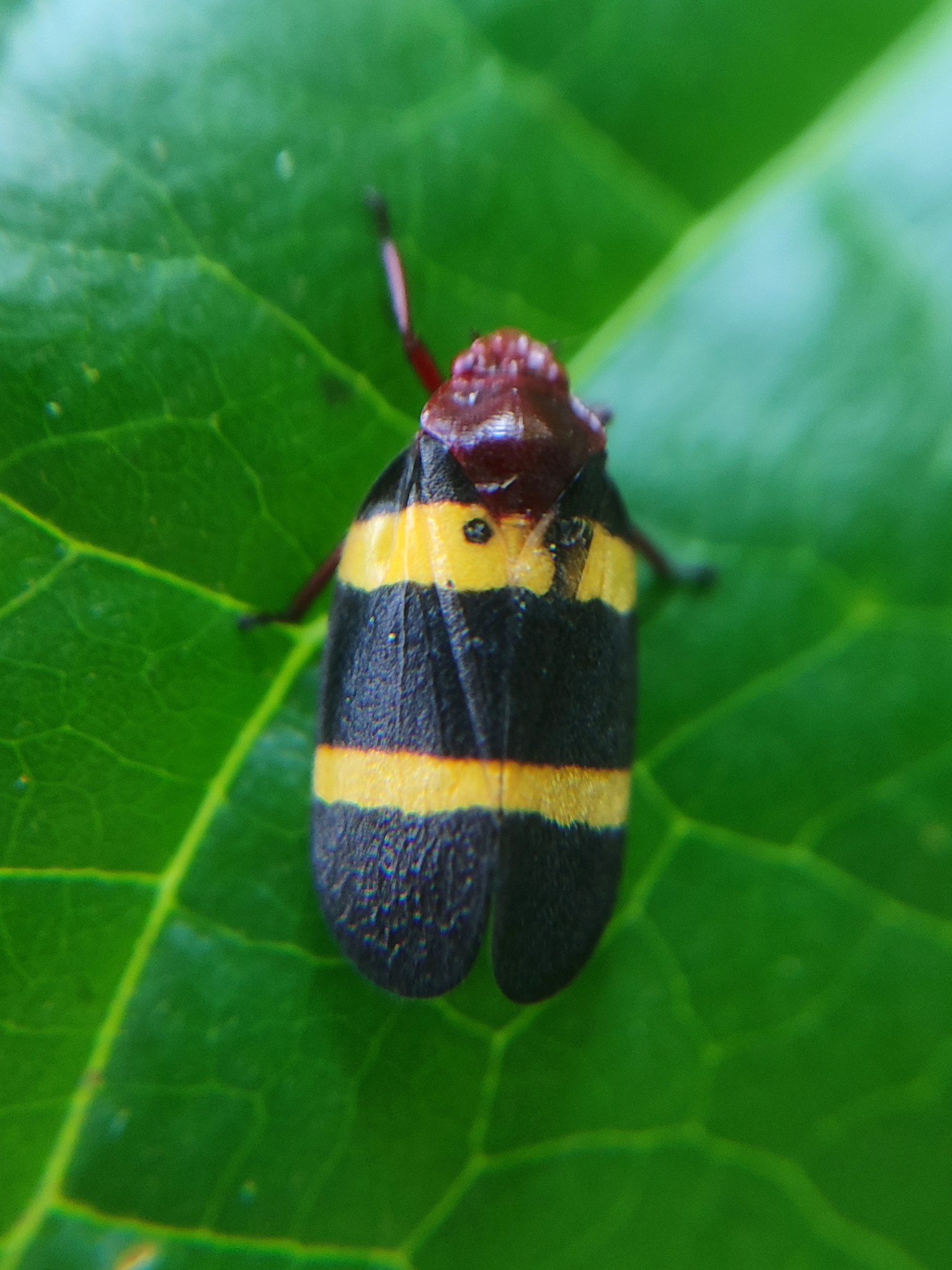
- Sphenorhina rubra

Scientific classification
- Kingdom: Animalia
- Phylum: Arthropoda
- Clade: Pancrustacea
- Class: Insecta
- Order: Hemiptera
- Suborder: Auchenorrhyncha
- Infraorder: Cicadomorpha
- Superfamily: Cercopoidea
- Family: Ischnorhinidae

= Ischnorhinidae =

Family of true bugs

Ischnorhinidae is the second largest family of Cercopoidea, a xylem-feeding insect group, formerly included in the family Cercopidae, and similarly commonly called froghoppers.

== Taxonomy ==
They belong to the hemipteran suborder Auchenorrhyncha. A 2023 phylogenetic study of the superfamily indicated the elevation of the New World cercopid subfamily Ischnorhininae to full family status as Ischnorhinidae was necessary in order to create a monophyletic Cercopidae, thereby now restricted exclusively to the Old World. This was based on the closer phylogenetic ties of Ischnorhinidae to Machaerotidae than to the remaining Cercopidae. The Cercopidae sensu stricto was then divided into two monophyletic subfamilies, Cercopinae and Cosmoscartinae, each with a number of tribes.

=== Tribes and genera ===
Tribe Ischnorhinini

- Baetkia Schmidt, 1920
- Choconta Fennah, 1979
- Homalogrypota Schmidt, 1920
- Huaina Fennah, 1979
- Iphirhina Fennah, 1968
- Ischnorhina Stål, 1869
- Laccogrypota Schmidt, 1920
- Neolaccogrypota Lallemand, 1924
- Neosphenorhina Distant, 1909
- Schistogonia Stål, 1869
- Sphenoclypeana Lallemand & Synave, 1952
- Tiodus Nast, 1950
- Typeschata Schmidt, 1920

Tribe Neaenini

- Helioptera Hamilton, 2016
- Hemitomaspis Lallemand, 1949
- Marcion Fennah, 1951
- Menytes Hamilton, 2016
- Neaenus Fowler, 1897
- Simorhina Jacobi, 1908
- Tomaspisinella Lallemand, 1927
- Zuata Fennah, 1968

Tribe Tomaspidini

- Aeneolamia Fennah, 1949
- Aracamunia Fennah, 1968
- Bradypteroscarta Lallemand, 1949
- Carachata Carvalho & Sakakibara, 1989
- Carpentiera Lallemand, 1954
- Catrimania Fennah, 1968
- Chinana Lallemand, 1927
- Deois Fennah, 1949
- Deoisella Costa & Sakakibara, 2002
- Ferorhinella Carvalho & Webb, 2004
- Gervasiella Paladini & Cavichioli, 2015
- Hemiplagiophleboptena Lallemand, 1949
- Hyalotomaspis Lallemand, 1949
- Hyboscarta Jacobi, 1908
- Isozulia Fennah, 1953
- Kanaima Distant, 1909
- Korobona Distant, 1909
- Lujana Lallemand, 1954
- Mahanarva Distant, 1909
- Makonaima Distant, 1909
- Maxantonia Schmidt, 1922
- Monecphora Amyot & Serville, 1843
- Neomonecphora Distant, 1909
- Notozulia Fennah, 1968
- Ocoaxo Fennah, 1968
- Olcotomaspis Lallemand, 1949
- Orodamnis Fennah, 1953
- Pachacanthocnemis Schmidt, 1910
- Panabrus Fennah, 1953
- Plagiophleboptena Schmidt, 1910
- Prosapia Fennah, 1949
- Sinopia Sakakibara, 1977
- Sphenorhina Amyot & Serville, 1843
- Tapaiuna Fennah, 1968
- Tomaspis Amyot & Serville, 1843
- Tomaspisina Distant, 1909
- Tropidorhinella Schmidt, 1910
- Tunaima Fennah, 1968
- Urubaxia Fennah, 1968
- Vorago Fennah, 1949
- Zulia Fennah, 1949
