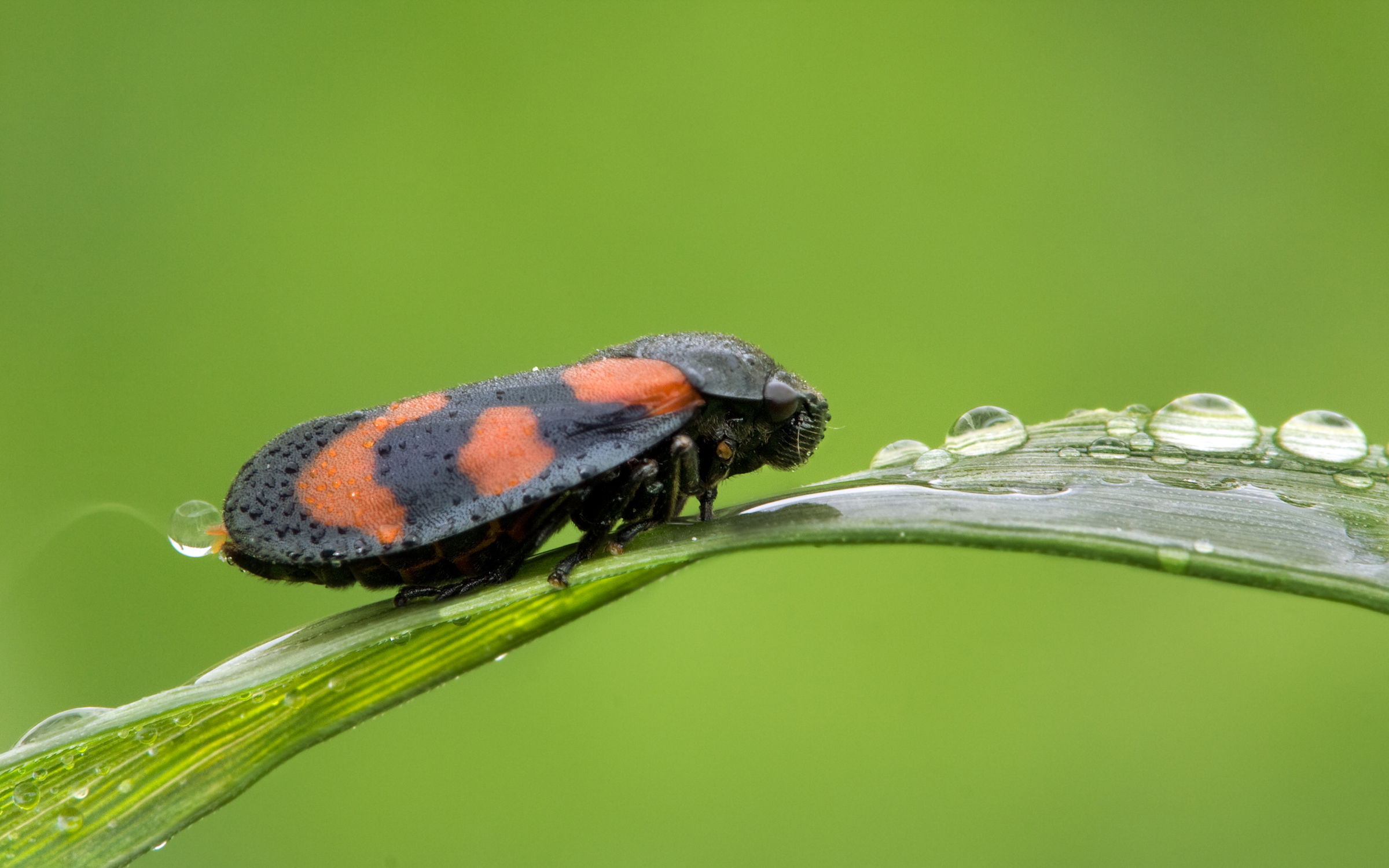
- Cercopis vulnerata

Scientific classification
- Kingdom: Animalia
- Phylum: Arthropoda
- Clade: Pancrustacea
- Class: Insecta
- Order: Hemiptera
- Suborder: Auchenorrhyncha
- Infraorder: Cicadomorpha
- Superfamily: Cercopoidea
- Family: Cercopidae; Leach, 1815

Subfamilies
- Cercopinae; Cosmoscartinae; (see text)

= Cercopidae =

Family of true bugs

Cercopidae are the largest family of Cercopoidea, a xylem-feeding insect group, commonly called froghoppers. They belong to the hemipteran suborder Auchenorrhyncha. A 2023 phylogenetic study of the family suggested the elevation of the New World subfamily Ischnorhininae to full family status as Ischnorhinidae, leaving a monophyletic Old World Cercopinae.

== Taxonomy ==
Based on a 2023 molecular phylogenetic analysis, the Cercopidae senso stricto was divided into two monophyletic subfamilies, Cercopinae and Cosmoscartinae, each with a number of tribes.

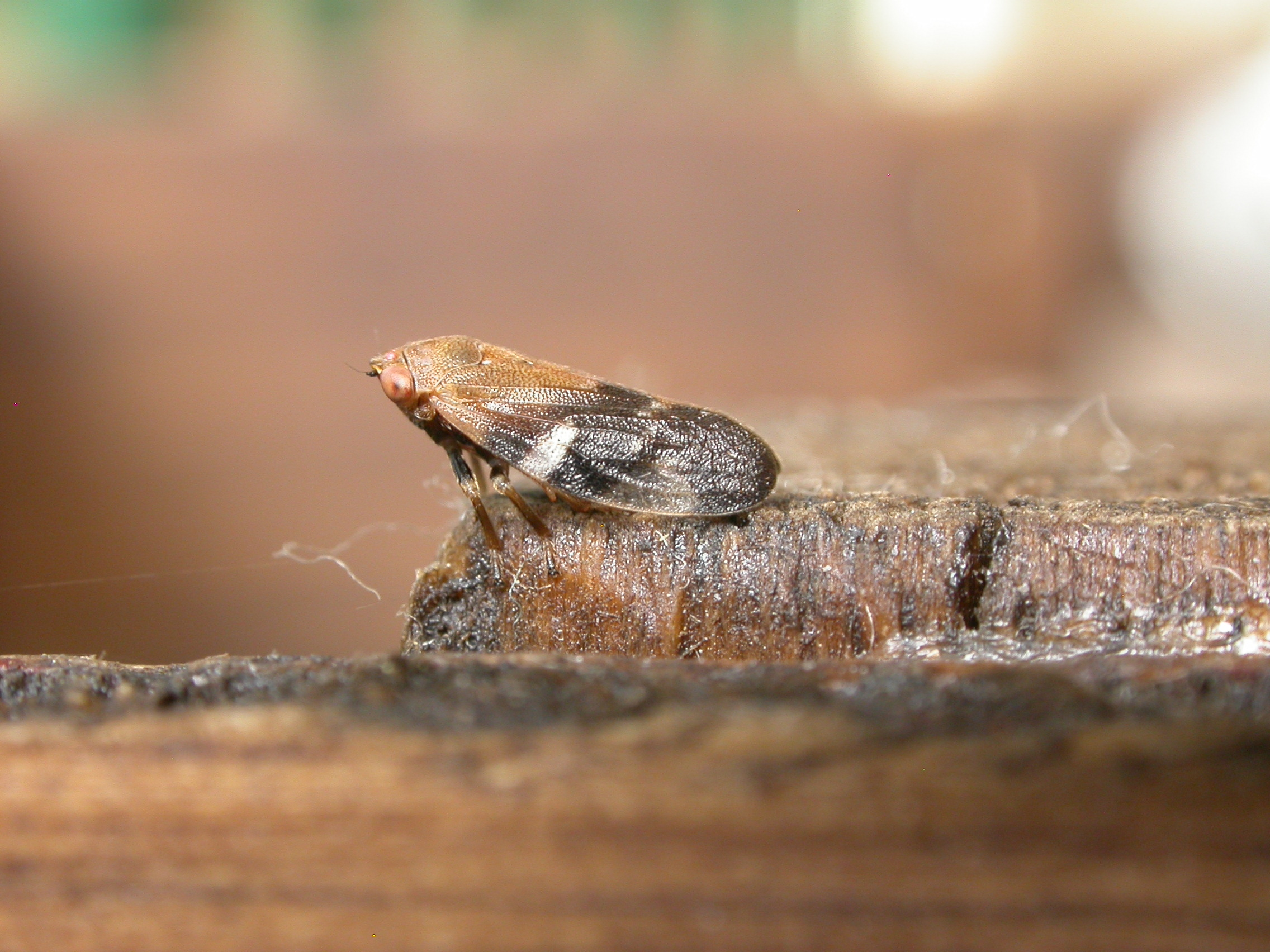
Anyllis leiala

=== Cercopinae ===
Tribe Bandusiini

- Bandisia Stål, 1866

Tribe Callitettigini

- Abidama Distant, 1908
- Callitettix Stål, 1865
- Caloscarta Breddin, 1903
- Moultoniella Lallemand, 1923
- Rhinastria Kirby, 1891
- Tadascarta Matsumura, 1940

Tribe Cercopini

- Cercopis Fabricius, 1775
- Haematoloma Haupt, 1919
- Triecphorella Nast, 1933

Tribe Haematoscartini

- Clypeocarta Lallemand & Synave, 1955
- Haematoscarta Breddin, 1903
- Lieftinckana Lallemand & Synave, 1955
- Straelenia Lallemand & Synave, 1955

Tribe Hemiaufidini

- Hemiaufidus Schmidt, 1920

Tribe Locrisini

- Anyllis Kirkaldy, 1906
- Dulitana Lallemand, 1939
- Locris Stål, 1866
- Nesaphrogeneia Kirkaldy, 1907
- Paralocris Lallemand, 1949

Tribe Rhinaulacini

- Amberana Distant, 1908
- Asiacercopis Liang, 1994
- Aufidus Stål, 1863
- Aufiterna Kirkaldy, 1906
- Augustohahnia Schmidt, 1920
- Baibarana Matsumura, 1940
- Bourgoinrana Soulier-Perkins, 2012
- Circulocercopis Liang & Webb, 2002
- Colsa Walker, 1857
- Eoscarta Breddin, 1902
- Euryaulax Kirkaldy, 1906
- Hemibandusia Schmidt, 1920
- Hemicercopis Schmidt, 1920
- Hemiliterna Lallemand, 1949
- Heteroliterna Lallemand, 1949
- Jacobsoniella Melichar, 1914
- Jeanneliensa Lallemand, 1920
- Kanozata Matsumura, 1940
- Lehina Melichar, 1915
- Leptoliterna Lallemand, 1949
- Liorhinella Haglund, 1899
- Literna Stål, 1866
- Machadoa Lallemand & Synave, 1952
- Mioscarta Breddin, 1901
- Nesaulax Jacobi, 1917
- Neocercopis Lallemand, 1932
- Paracercopis Schmidt, 1925
- Paracercopoides Liang, 1994
- Paraliterna Lallemand, 1949
- Paramioscarta Lallemand, 1949
- Parapisidice Lallemand, 1949
- Petyllis Kirkaldy, 1906
- Poeciloterpa Stål, 1870
- Rhinaulax Amyot & Serville, 1843
- Sounama Distant, 1908
- Synavea Lallemand, 1955
- Telogmometopius Jacobi, 1921
- Thoodzata Distant, 1908
- Trigonoschema Crispolon & Soulier-Perkins, 2021
- Villiersana Lallemand, 1942
- Wawi Soulier-Perkins & Le Cesne, 2016

Tribe incertae sedis

- Alluaudensia Lallemand, 1920
- Ambonga Melichar, 1915
- Blötea Lallemand, 1957
- Cercopicesa Koçak & Kemal, 2008
- Euglobiceps Lallemand, 1923
- Euryliterna Blöte, 1957
- Janssensia Lallemand, 1954
- Lamprochlamys Fennah, 1966
- Leptynis Jacobi, 1921
- Orthorhinella Schmidt, 1910
- Paramonecphora Lallemand & Synave, 1954
- Phlebarcys Schmidt, 1910
- Pisianax Jacobi, 1921
- Pogonorhinella Schmidt, 1910
- Pseudocercopis Schmidt, 1920

=== Cosmoscartinae ===
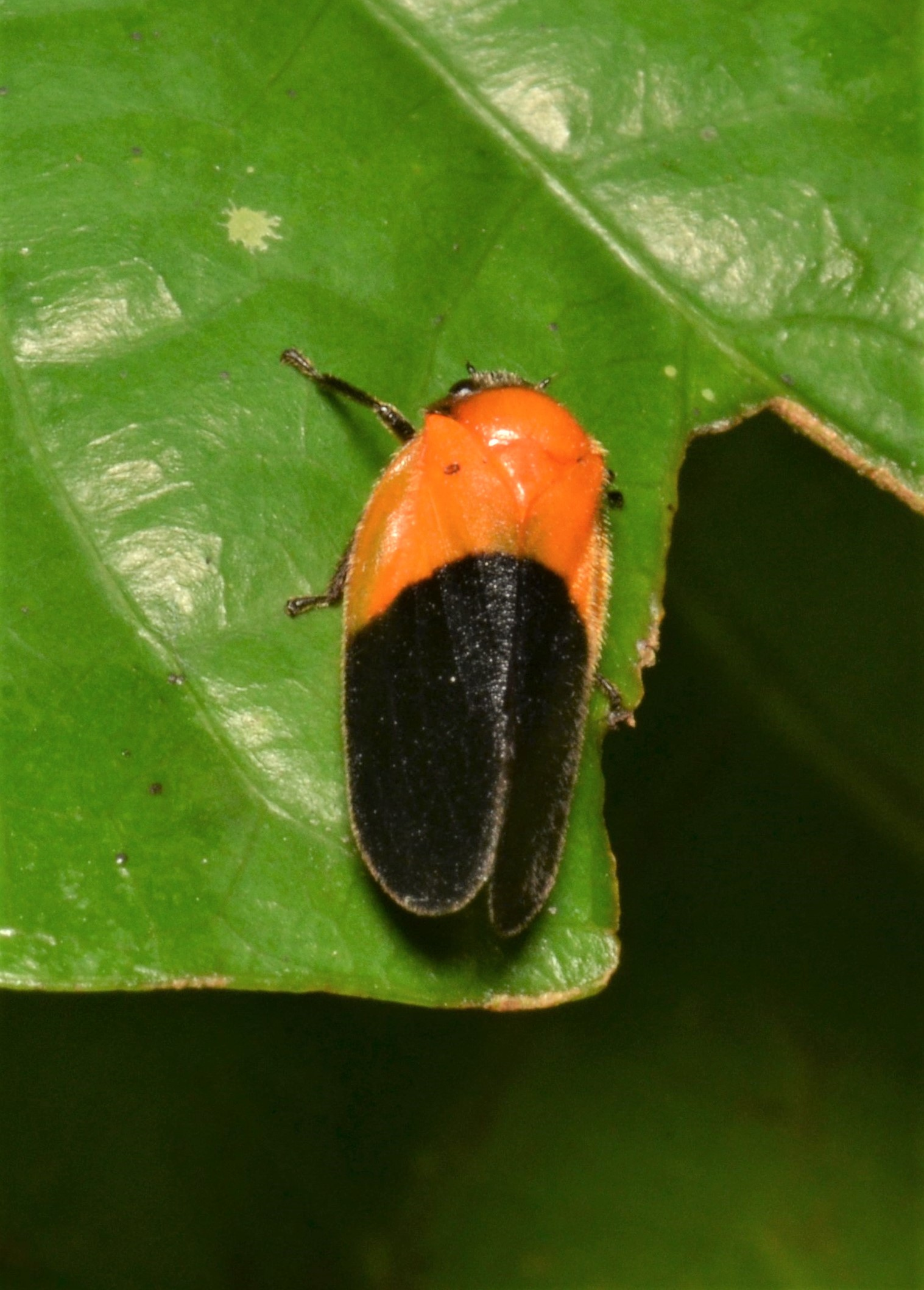
Paraceropoides flavithorax

Tribe Considiini

- Considia Stål, 1865
- Paphnutius Distant, 1916

Tribe Cosmoscartini

- Cosmoscarta Stål, 1869
- Ectemnonotops Schmidt, 1910
- Ectemnonotum Schmidt, 1909
- Eubakeriella Lallemand, 1923
- Gynopygocarta Lallemand, 1930
- Gynopygolax Schmidt, 1909
- Helioscarta Lallemand, 1956
- Homalostethus Schmidt, 1910
- Kanoscarta Matsumura, 1940
- Kotozata Matsumura, 1940
- Okiscarta Matsumura, 1940
- Oxymegaspis Schmidt, 1911
- Oxypeltarion Lallemand & Synave, 1961
- Platynotoscarta Lallemand & Synave, 1961

Tribe Phymatostethini

- Phymastostheta Stål, 1870

Tribe Suracartini

- Anoplosnastus Schmidt, 1910
- Ectemnocarta Lallemand, 1939
- Leptataspis Schmidt, 1910
- Megastethodon Schmidt, 1910
- Opistharsostethus Schmidt, 1911
- Serapita Schmidt, 1909
- Simeliria Schmidt, 1909
- Suracarta Schmidt, 1909

Tribe Trichoscartini

- Hemitrichoscarta Lallemand & Synave, 1961
- Neoporpacella Lallemand & Synave, 1961
- Paratrichoscarta Lallemand & Synave, 1953
- Pisidice Jacobi, 1912
- Porpacella Schmidt, 1910
- Trichoscarta Breddin, 1902

Tribe incertae sedis

- Radioscarta Lallemand, 1923

=== Invalid genera ===
Crispolon Jr et al. (2023) considered certain described genera as invalid without discussion and did not include them in the family as prescribed by their phylogeny.

- Delassor Fennah, 1949 (junior synonym of Mahanarva in Ischnorhinidae)
- Funkhouseria Lallemand, 1938 (junior synonym of Mahanarva in Ischnorhinidae)
- Hemieoscarta Lallemand, 1949 (junior synonym of Eoscarta)
- Kuscarta Matsumura, 1940 (junior synonym of Sounama)
- Luederwaldtia Schmidt, 1922 (junior synonym of Mahanarva in Ischnorhinidae)
- Pachypterinella Lallemand, 1927 (junior synonym of Kanaima in Ischnorhinidae)
- Pseudeoscarta Lallemand, 1933 (junior synonym of Eoscarta)
- Stenaulophrys Jacobi, 1921 (junior synonym of Sounama)
- Vigilantius Distant, 1916 (junior synonym of Eoscarta)

=== Fossil genera ===
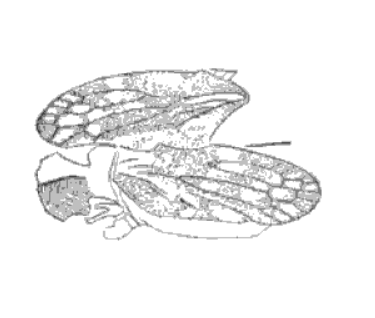
†Dawsonites veter 1895 illustration

- †Allocercopis Lin, 1997
- †Berro Szwedo, 2019
- †Cercopites Scudder, 1890
- †Cicadellites Heer, 1853
- †Dawsonites Scudder, 1895
- †Eocercopidium Zeuner, 1944
- †Lithecphora Scudder, 1890
- †Locrites Scudder, 1890
- †Megacercopis Cockerell, 1925
- †Nangamostethos Xu & Szwedo, 2022
- †Nisocercopis Lin, 1977
- †Palecphora Scudder, 1890
- †Parafitopteryx Martins-Neto, 1989
- †Prinecphora Scudder, 1890
- †Stenecphora Scudder, 1895
- †Stenolocris Scudder, 1895

== Taxa removed from Cercopidae ==
Crispolon Jr. et al.s 2023 molocular phylogenetic analysis recommended removing the following genera from Cercopidae and transferring them to Aphrophoridae:

- Hemitriecphora Lallemand, 1949
- Microsargane Fowler, 1897

Additionally they recommended the elevation of the subfamily Ischnorhininae, endemic to the Americas, to full family status as Ischnorhinidae. This was based on the closer phylogenetic ties to Machaerotidae than to subfamily Cercopinae found exclusively in Europe, Africa, and Asia, Australasia:
