= List of Clastoptera species =

This is a list of species in the genus Clastoptera.

== Clastoptera species ==
- Clastoptera achatina Germar, 1839 (pecan spittlebug)
- Clastoptera arborina Ball, 1927 (red cedar spittlebug)
- Clastoptera arizonana Doering, 1928 (Arizona spittlebug)
- Clastoptera atrapicata Hamilton, 1977
- Clastoptera binotata Ball, 1895
- Clastoptera brunnea Ball, 1919
- Clastoptera canyonensia Doering, 1928
- Clastoptera delicata Uhler, 1875
- Clastoptera distincta Doering, 1928
- Clastoptera doeringae Hamilton, 1978 (mountain-juniper spittlebug)
- Clastoptera elongata Doering, 1928
- Clastoptera hyperici Gibson, 1920
- Clastoptera juniperina Ball, 1919 (juniper spittlebug)
- Clastoptera laevigata
- Clastoptera lawsoni Doering, 1928
- Clastoptera lineatocollis Stål, 1854
- Clastoptera lugubris Ball, 1919
- Clastoptera media Doering, 1928
- Clastoptera mineralis Thompson, 2023
- Clastoptera newporta Doering, 1928
- Clastoptera obtusa (Say, 1825) (alder spittlebug)
- Clastoptera octonotata
- Clastoptera osborni Gillette and Baker, 1895
- Clastoptera ovata Doering, 1928
- Clastoptera pallidocephala Doering, 1928
- Clastoptera proteus Fitch, 1851 (dogwood spittlebug)
- Clastoptera saintcyri Provancher, 1872 (heath spittlebug)
- Clastoptera salicis Doering, 1926
- Clastoptera sierra Doering, 1928
- Clastoptera siskiyou Doering, 1928
- Clastoptera testacea Fitch, 1851
- Clastoptera texana Doering, 1928
- Clastoptera tricincta Doering, 1928
- Clastoptera uniformia Doering, 1928
- Clastoptera xanthocephala Germar, 1839 (sunflower spittlebug)
