= Clastoptera testacea =

Scientific classification
- Domain: Eukaryota
- Kingdom: Animalia
- Phylum: Arthropoda
- Class: Insecta
- Order: Hemiptera
- Suborder: Auchenorrhyncha
- Family: Clastopteridae
- Genus: Clastoptera
- Species: C. testacea

Binomial name
- Clastoptera testacea Fitch, 1851

Species of true bug

Clastoptera testacea is a species of spittlebug in the family Clastopteridae. It is found in North America.
