= Clastoptera lawsoni =

Scientific classification
- Domain: Eukaryota
- Kingdom: Animalia
- Phylum: Arthropoda
- Class: Insecta
- Order: Hemiptera
- Suborder: Auchenorrhyncha
- Family: Clastopteridae
- Genus: Clastoptera
- Species: C. lawsoni

Binomial name
- Clastoptera lawsoni Doering, 1929

Species of true bug

Clastoptera lawsoni is a species in the superfamily Cercopoidea ("spittlebugs"), in the order Hemiptera ("true bugs, cicadas, hoppers, aphids and allies"). It is found in North America.
