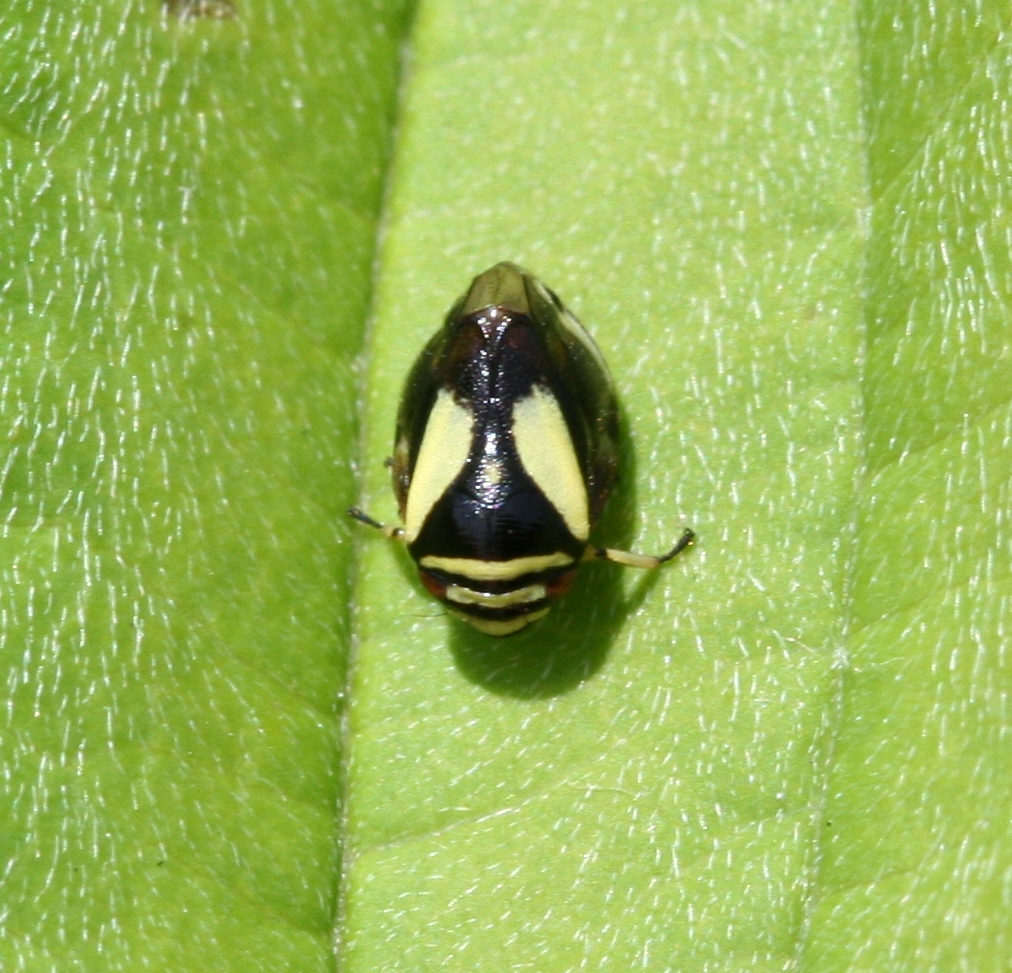

Scientific classification
- Domain: Eukaryota
- Kingdom: Animalia
- Phylum: Arthropoda
- Class: Insecta
- Order: Hemiptera
- Suborder: Auchenorrhyncha
- Family: Clastopteridae
- Genus: Clastoptera
- Species: C. proteus

Binomial name
- Clastoptera proteus Fitch, 1851

= Clastoptera proteus =

Species of true bug

Clastoptera proteus, the dogwood spittlebug, is a species of spittlebug in the family Clastopteridae. It is found in North America.

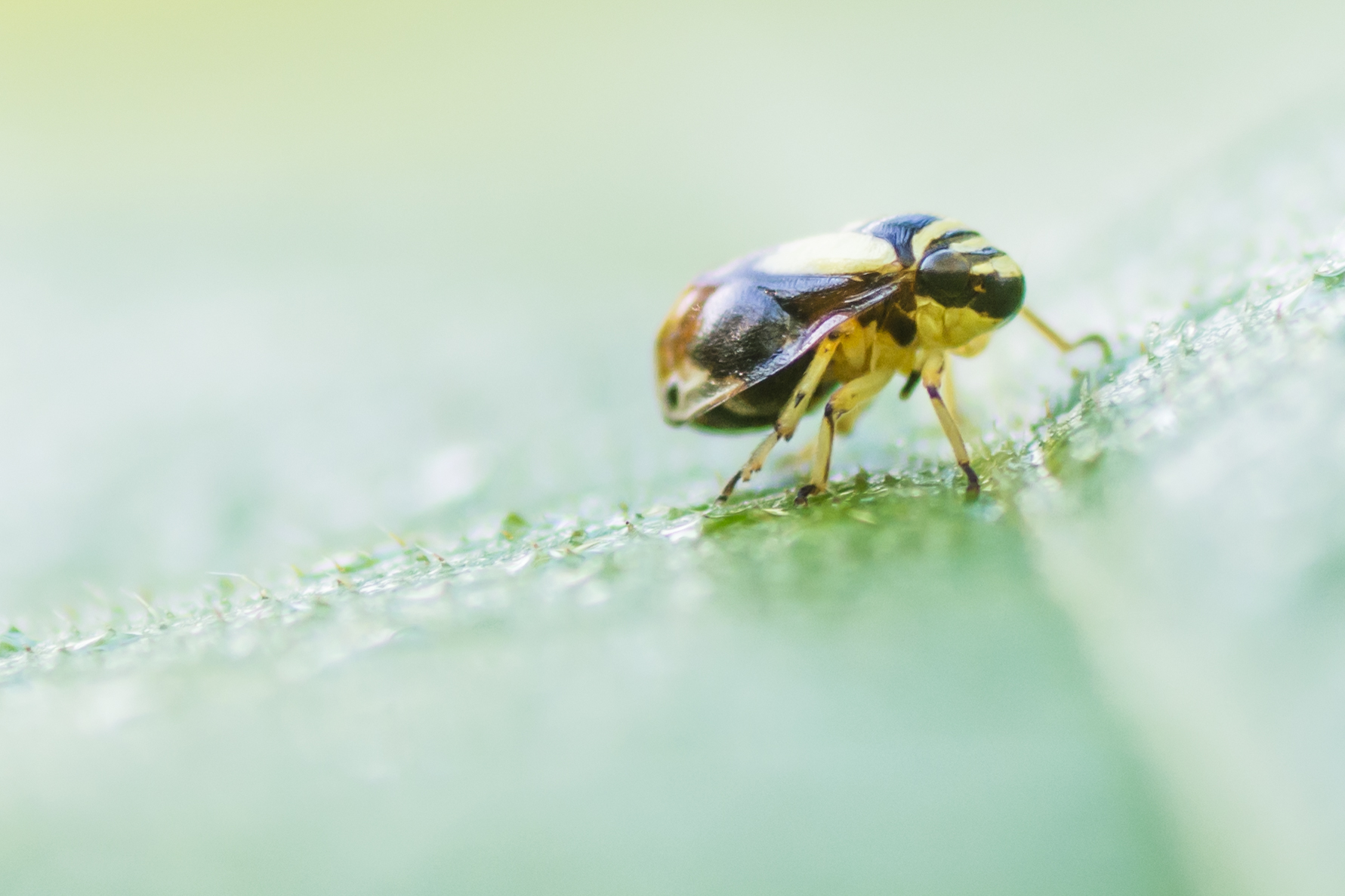
Dogwood spittlebug, Clastoptera proteus

== Subspecies ==
These 10 subspecies belong to the species Clastoptera proteus:

- Clastoptera proteus anceps McAtee
- Clastoptera proteus candens McAtee
- Clastoptera proteus flava Ball
- Clastoptera proteus hyperici McAtee
- Clastoptera proteus nigra Ball
- Clastoptera proteus nigricollis Fitch
- Clastoptera proteus osceola Ball
- Clastoptera proteus proteus
- Clastoptera proteus seminuda Ball
- Clastoptera proteus vittata Ball
