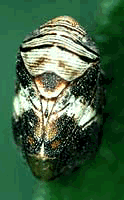

Scientific classification
- Kingdom: Animalia
- Phylum: Arthropoda
- Class: Insecta
- Order: Hemiptera
- Suborder: Auchenorrhyncha
- Family: Clastopteridae
- Genus: Clastoptera
- Species: C. arizonana

Binomial name
- Clastoptera arizonana Doering, 1928

= Clastoptera arizonana =

Species of true bug

Clastoptera arizonana, the Arizona spittlebug, is a species of spittlebug in the family Clastopteridae. It is found in North America.
