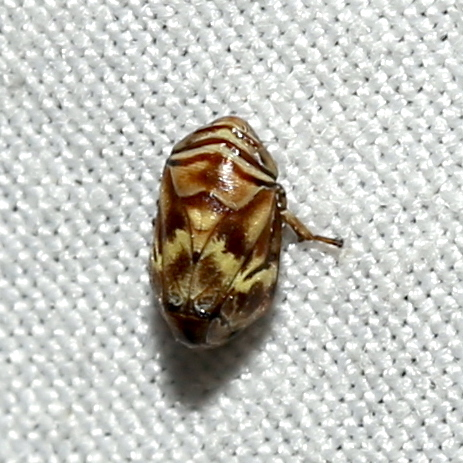

Scientific classification
- Kingdom: Animalia
- Phylum: Arthropoda
- Class: Insecta
- Order: Hemiptera
- Suborder: Auchenorrhyncha
- Family: Clastopteridae
- Genus: Clastoptera
- Species: C. arborina

Binomial name
- Clastoptera arborina Ball, 1927

= Clastoptera arborina =

Species of true bug

Clastoptera arborina, the red cedar spittlebug, is a species of spittlebug in the family Clastopteridae. It is found in North America.
