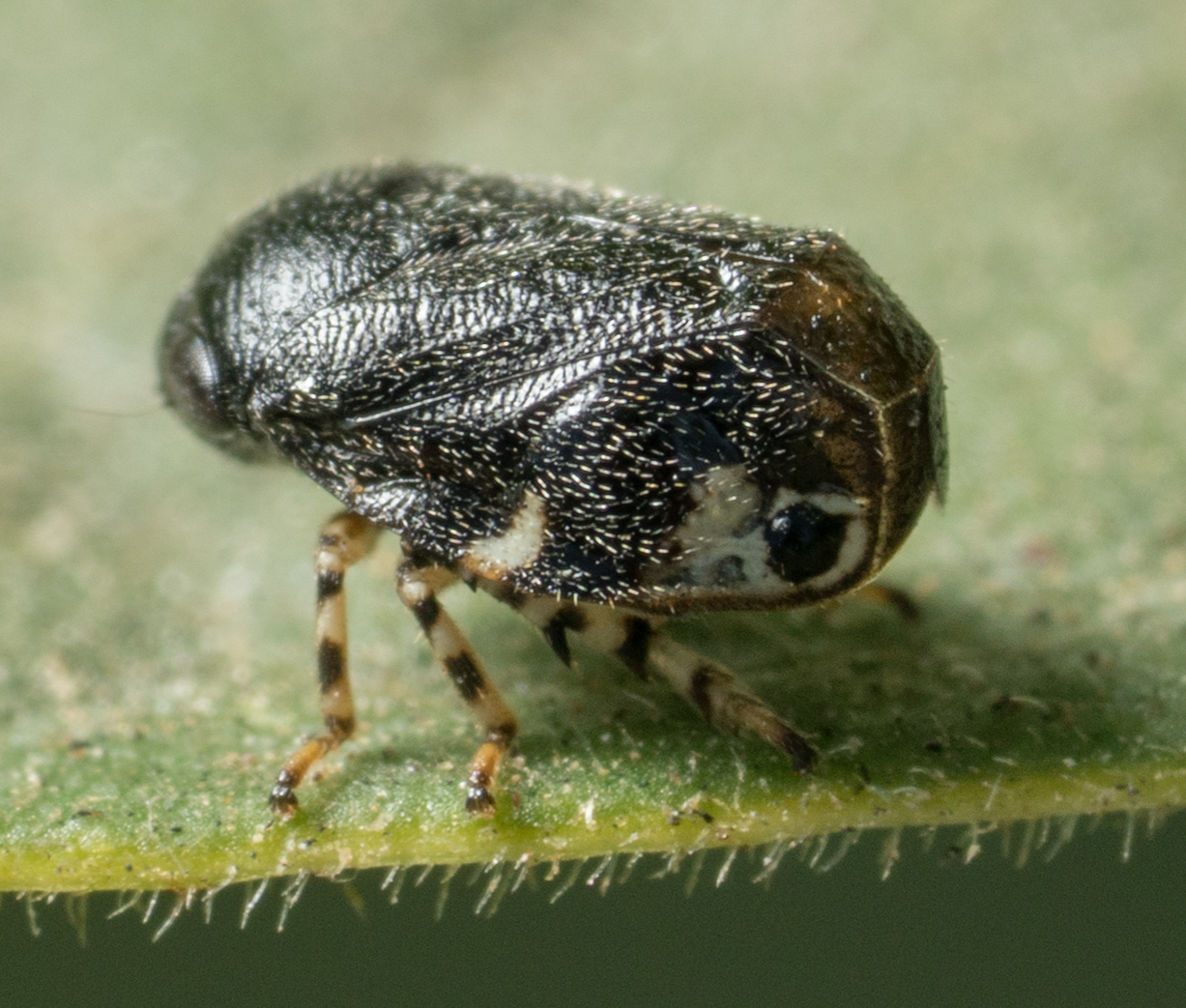
- Clastoptera lineatocollis, California

Scientific classification
- Kingdom: Animalia
- Phylum: Arthropoda
- Clade: Pancrustacea
- Class: Insecta
- Order: Hemiptera
- Suborder: Auchenorrhyncha
- Family: Clastopteridae
- Genus: Clastoptera
- Species: C. lineatocollis

Binomial name
- Clastoptera lineatocollis Stål, 1854

= Clastoptera lineatocollis =

Species of true bug

Clastoptera lineatocollis is a species of spittlebug in the family Clastopteridae. It is found in North America.
