= Clastoptera saintcyri =

Scientific classification
- Domain: Eukaryota
- Kingdom: Animalia
- Phylum: Arthropoda
- Class: Insecta
- Order: Hemiptera
- Suborder: Auchenorrhyncha
- Family: Clastopteridae
- Genus: Clastoptera
- Species: C. saintcyri

Binomial name
- Clastoptera saintcyri Provancher, 1872

Species of true bug

Clastoptera saintcyri, the heath spittlebug, is a species of spittlebug in the family Clastopteridae. It is found in North America.
