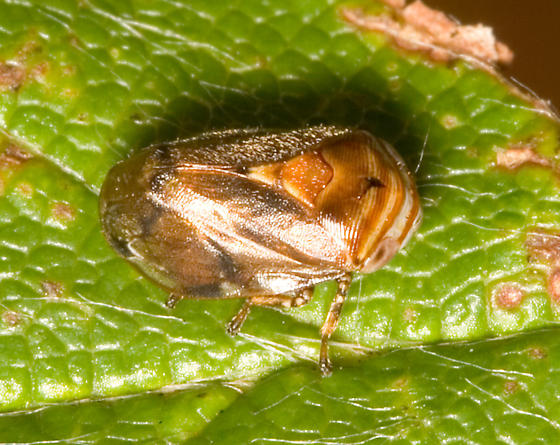

Scientific classification
- Domain: Eukaryota
- Kingdom: Animalia
- Phylum: Arthropoda
- Class: Insecta
- Order: Hemiptera
- Suborder: Auchenorrhyncha
- Family: Clastopteridae
- Genus: Clastoptera
- Species: C. obtusa

Binomial name
- Clastoptera obtusa (Say, 1825)

= Clastoptera obtusa =

Species of true bug

Clastoptera obtusa, the alder spittlebug, is a species of spittlebug in the family Clastopteridae. It is found in North America.

== Subspecies ==
These three subspecies belong to the species Clastoptera obtusa:

- Clastoptera obtusa borealis Ball
- Clastoptera obtusa obtusa
- Clastoptera obtusa pallida Ball
