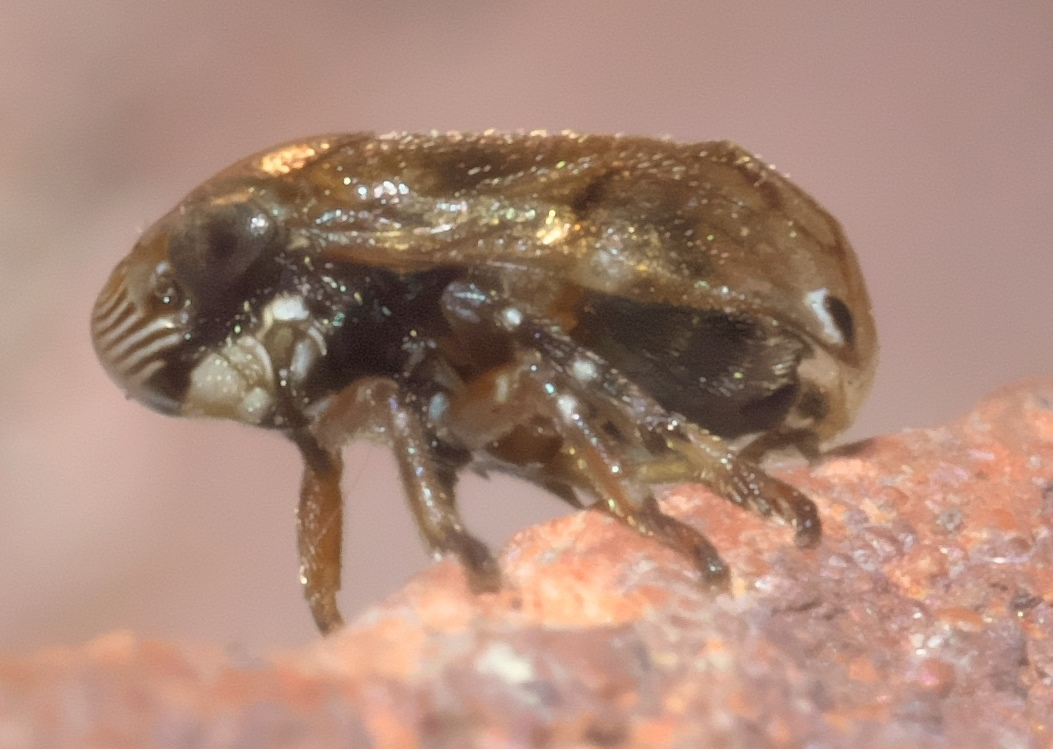

Scientific classification
- Domain: Eukaryota
- Kingdom: Animalia
- Phylum: Arthropoda
- Class: Insecta
- Order: Hemiptera
- Suborder: Auchenorrhyncha
- Family: Clastopteridae
- Genus: Clastoptera
- Species: C. xanthocephala

Binomial name
- Clastoptera xanthocephala Germar, 1839

= Clastoptera xanthocephala =

Species of true bug

Clastoptera xanthocephala, the sunflower spittlebug, is a species of spittlebug in the family Clastopteridae. It is found in North America and Oceania.

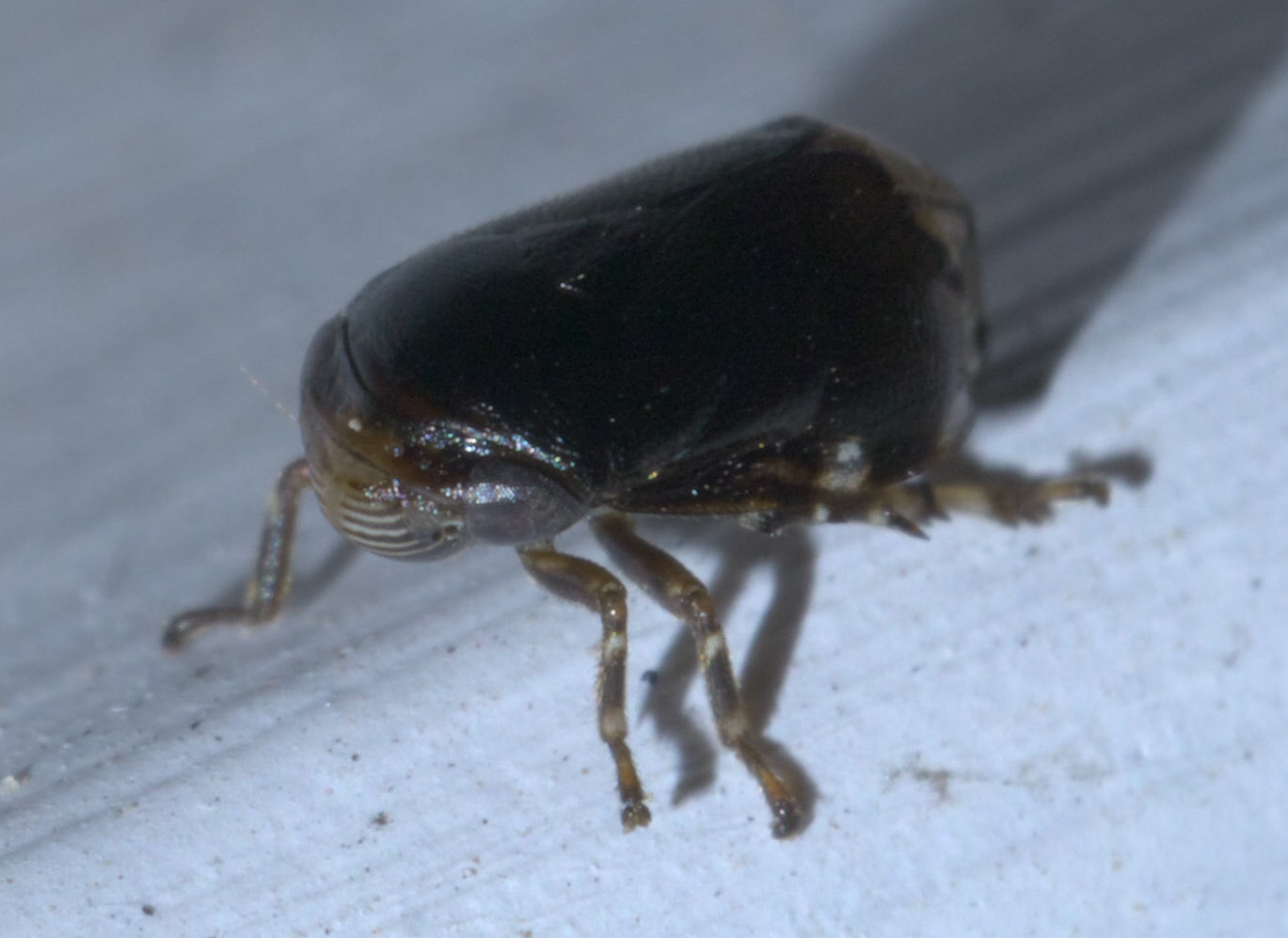
Sunflower spittlebug, Clastoptera xanthocephala
