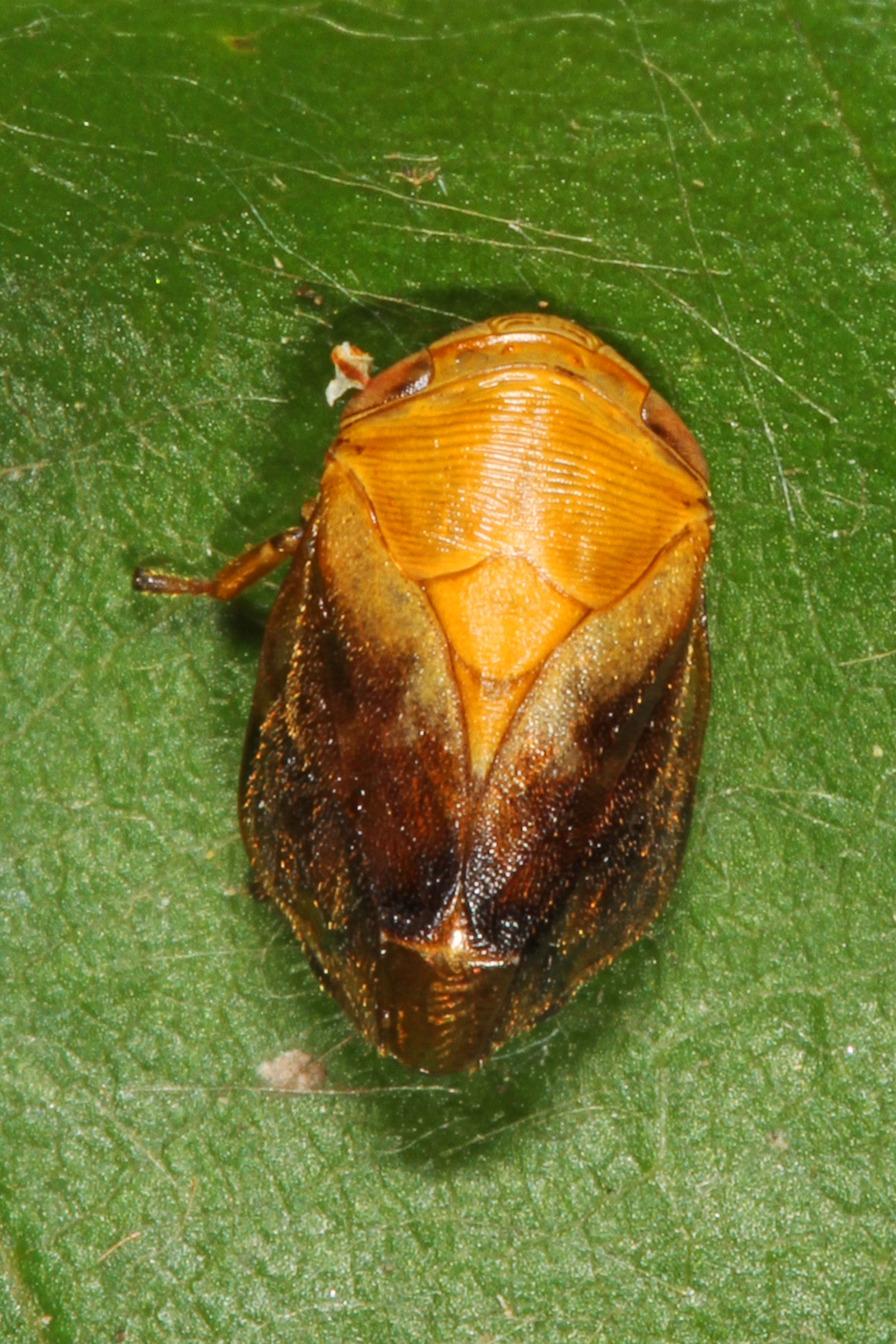

Scientific classification
- Domain: Eukaryota
- Kingdom: Animalia
- Phylum: Arthropoda
- Class: Insecta
- Order: Hemiptera
- Suborder: Auchenorrhyncha
- Family: Clastopteridae
- Genus: Clastoptera
- Species: C. achatina

Binomial name
- Clastoptera achatina Germar, 1839

= Clastoptera achatina =

Species of true bug

Clastoptera achatina, the pecan spittlebug, is a species of spittlebug in the family Clastopteridae. It is found in North America.

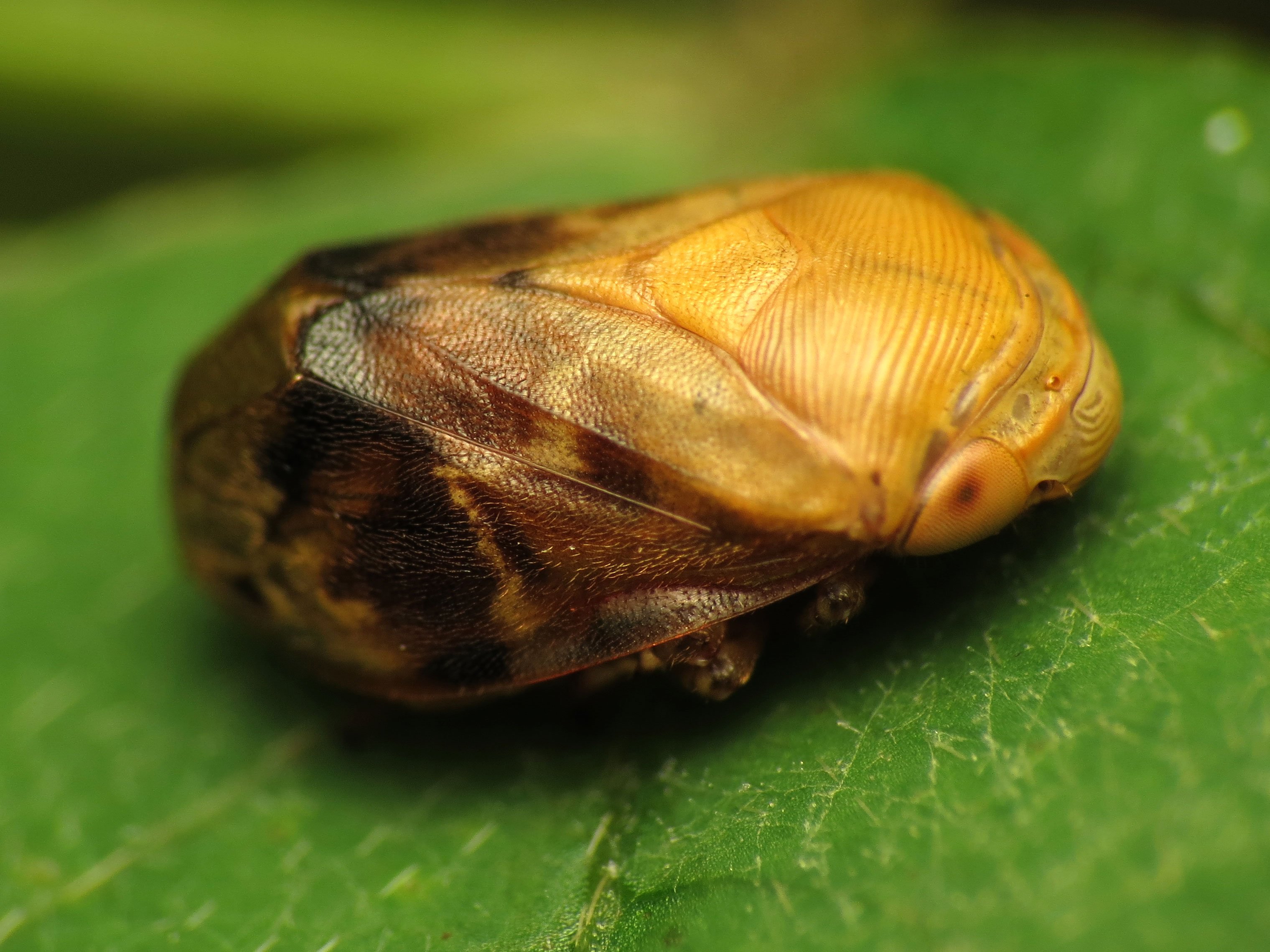
Pecan spittlebug, Clastoptera achatina
