= Clastoptera delicata =

Scientific classification
- Domain: Eukaryota
- Kingdom: Animalia
- Phylum: Arthropoda
- Class: Insecta
- Order: Hemiptera
- Suborder: Auchenorrhyncha
- Family: Clastopteridae
- Genus: Clastoptera
- Species: C. delicata

Binomial name
- Clastoptera delicata Uhler, 1875

Species of true bug

Clastoptera delicata is a species of spittlebug in the family Clastopteridae, found in North America.
