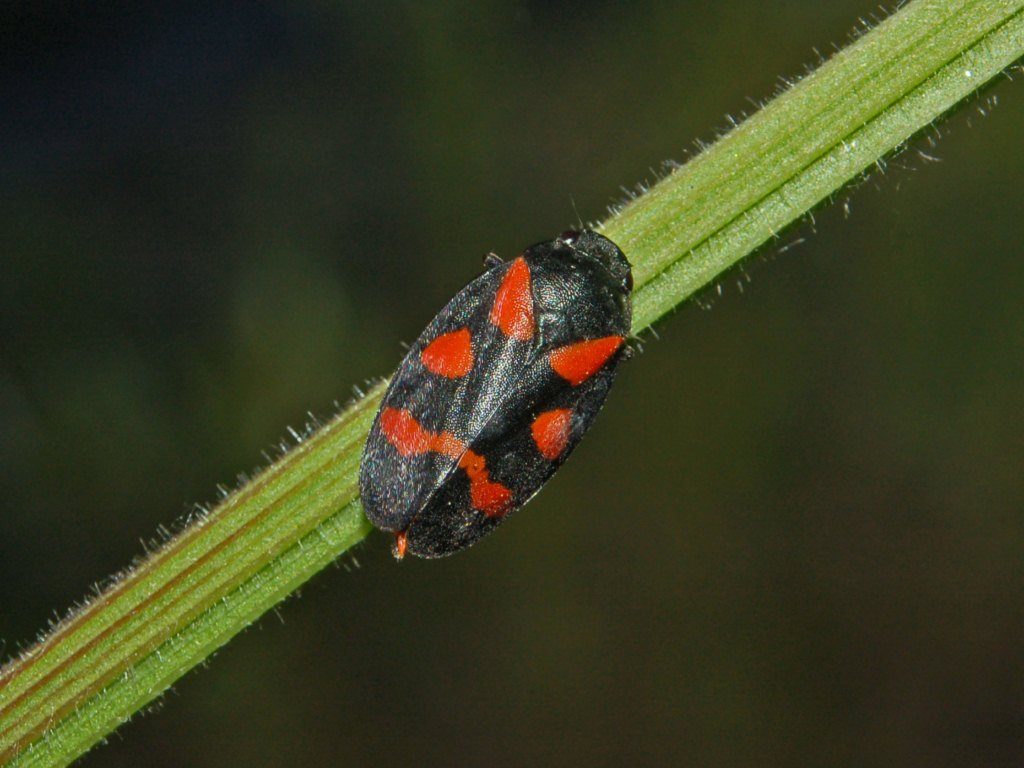
- Upperside
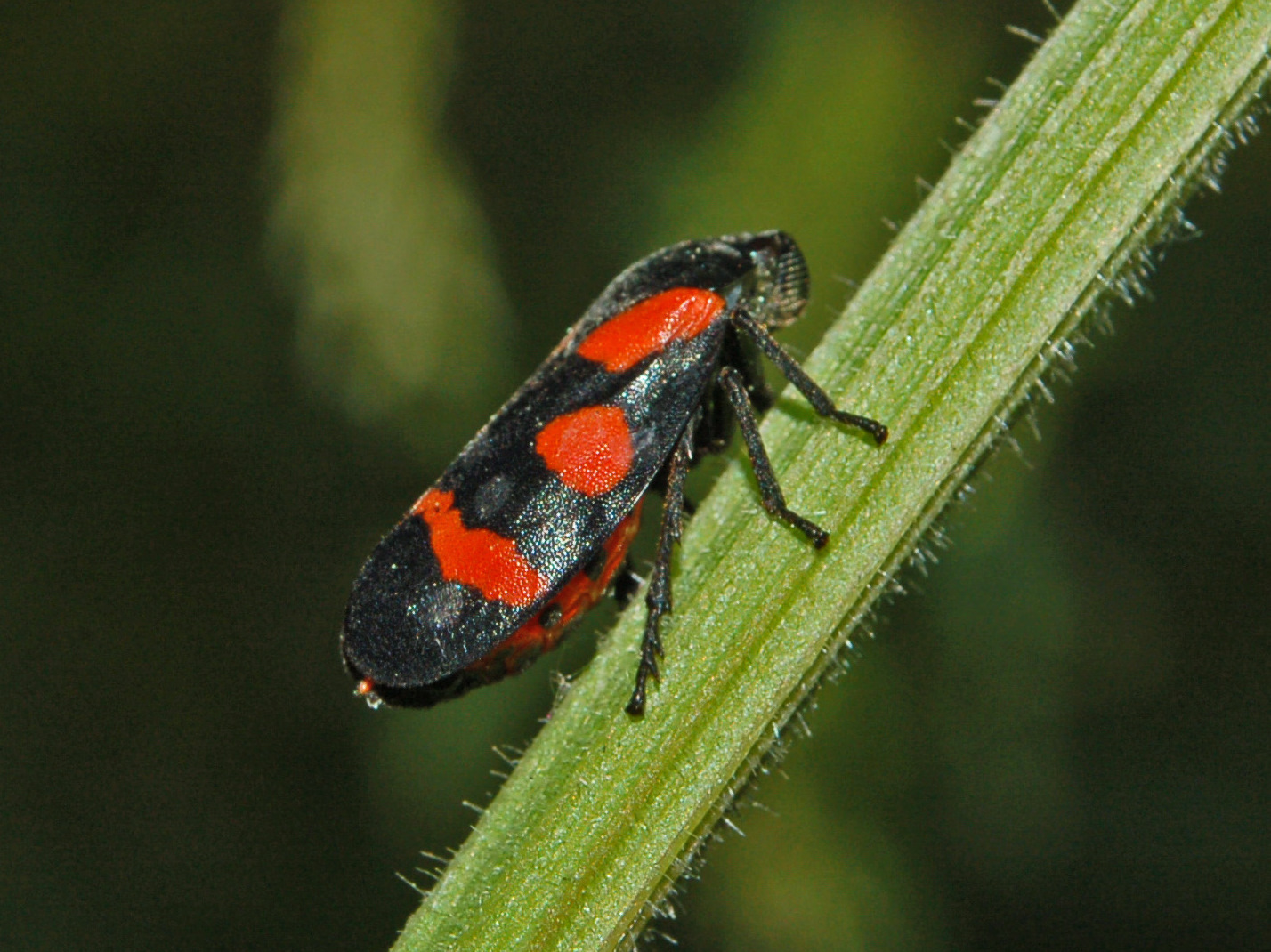
- Side view

Scientific classification
- Domain: Eukaryota
- Kingdom: Animalia
- Phylum: Arthropoda
- Class: Insecta
- Order: Hemiptera
- Suborder: Auchenorrhyncha
- Family: Cercopidae
- Genus: Cercopis
- Species: C. sanguinolenta

Binomial name
- Cercopis sanguinolenta (Scopoli, 1763)

Synonyms
- Cicada sanguinolenta Scopoli, 1763; Cercopis mactata Germar, 1821; Triecphora mactata (Germar, 1821); Triecphora sanguinolenta (Scopoli, 1763)

= Cercopis sanguinolenta =

Species of insect

Cercopis sanguinolenta is a species of froghopper in the family Cercopidae.

== Distribution and habitat ==
This species mainly occurs in southern Europe up to Caucasus and the Near East. These froghoppers inhabit dry, sunny slopes and herbaceous rich clearings.

== Description ==
Cercopis sanguinolenta can reach a length of 6–11 millimetres (0.24–0.43 in). The male is larger than the female. These froghopper are shining black with bright red marks on the elytra, one spot at the base, one spot in the middle and a stripe at the apex.

Bodies in dorsal view are elongated and ovoid. The head is much narrower than the pronotum. Legs are always completely black. Very rarely, red marks are reduced or even missing, and such specimens are almost completely black. The adults of Cercopis, just after getting free from the nymphal exuvia, show pink or whitish markings instead of blood-red.

This species is very similar to Cercopis vulnerata, but its red stripes are smaller and the rear stripe is only slightly curved, while in Cercopis vulnerata it is U-shaped. Cercopis sanguinolenta also has a few black spots on the ventral plates of the connexivum, the lateral border of the abdomen.

== Biology ==
Adults can be seen in May through July or August on herbaceous plants and shrubs, mainly in meadows and woodland edges. It feeds on the sap of the plants. It can fly, but it more often moves by jumping.

When they mate Cercopis male and female stay side by side with an angle of less than 45°.

Larvae live surrounded by their own secretions in a sort of foam nest and suck the juices on the roots of the host plants.

== Gallery ==
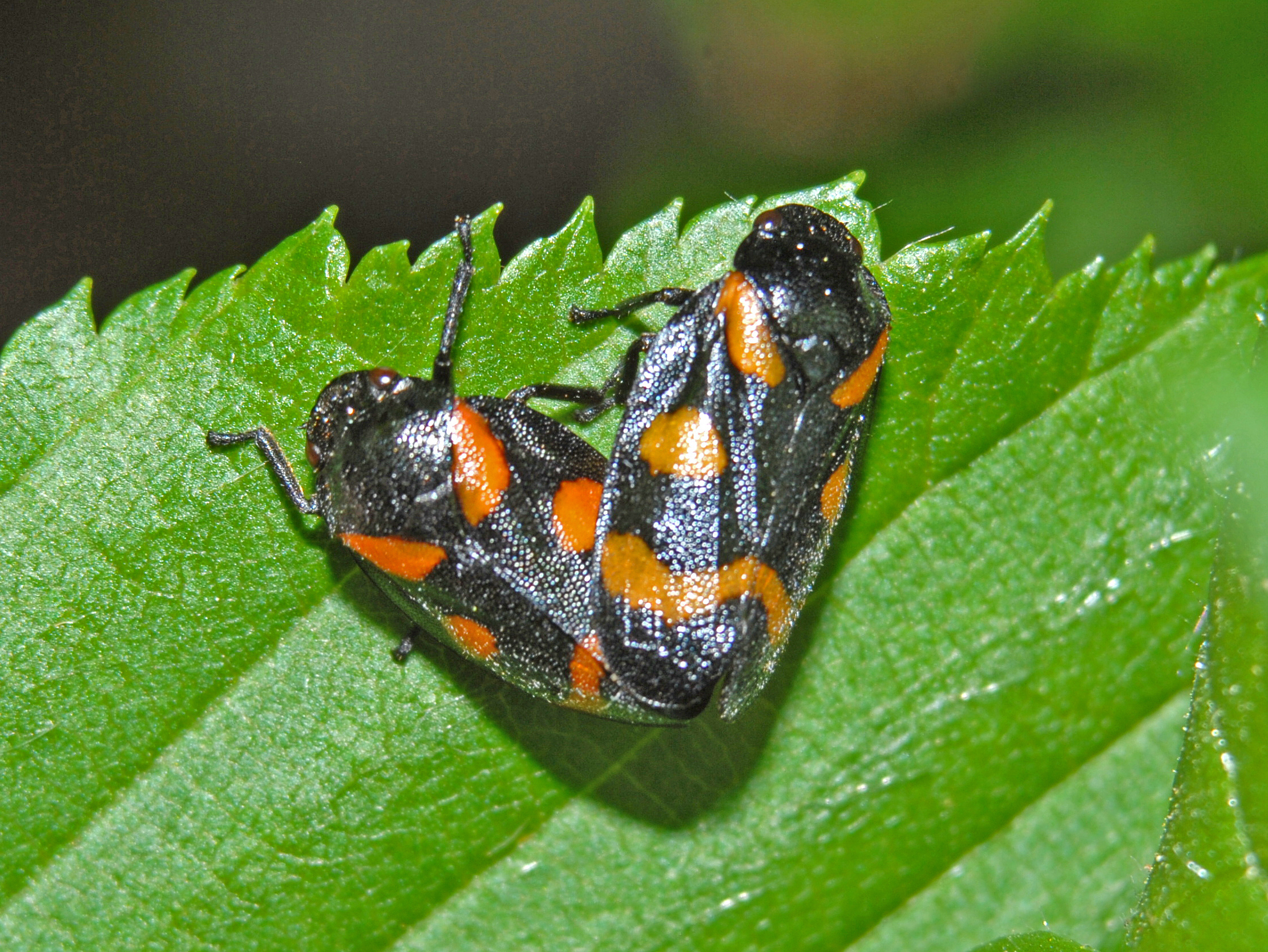
Mating

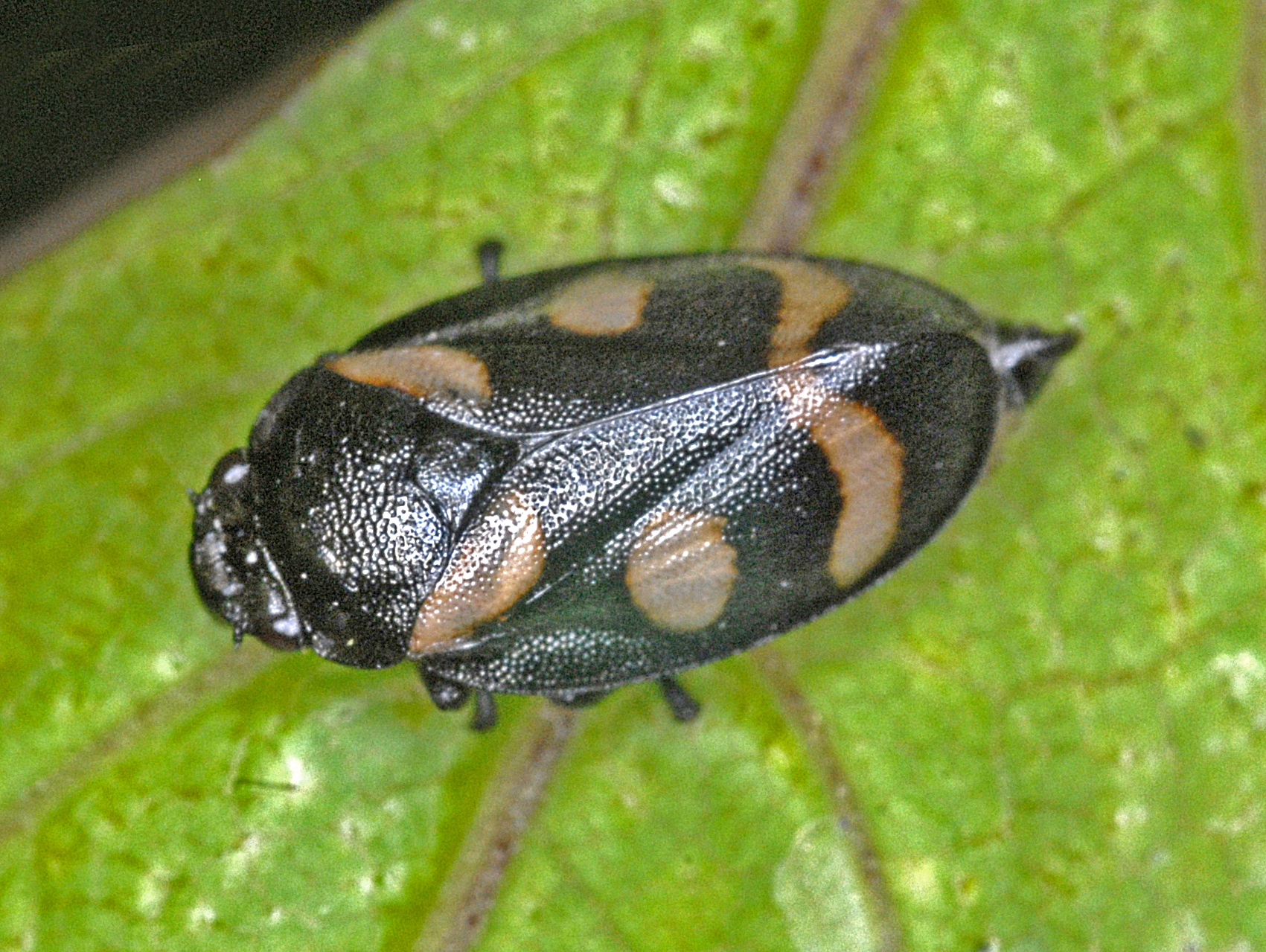
Adult just outside the exuviae, showing pinkish markings

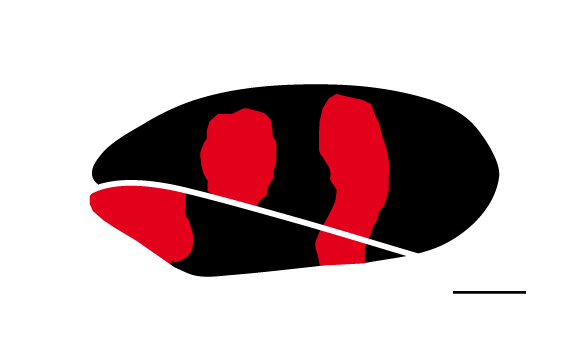
Drawing of a wing
