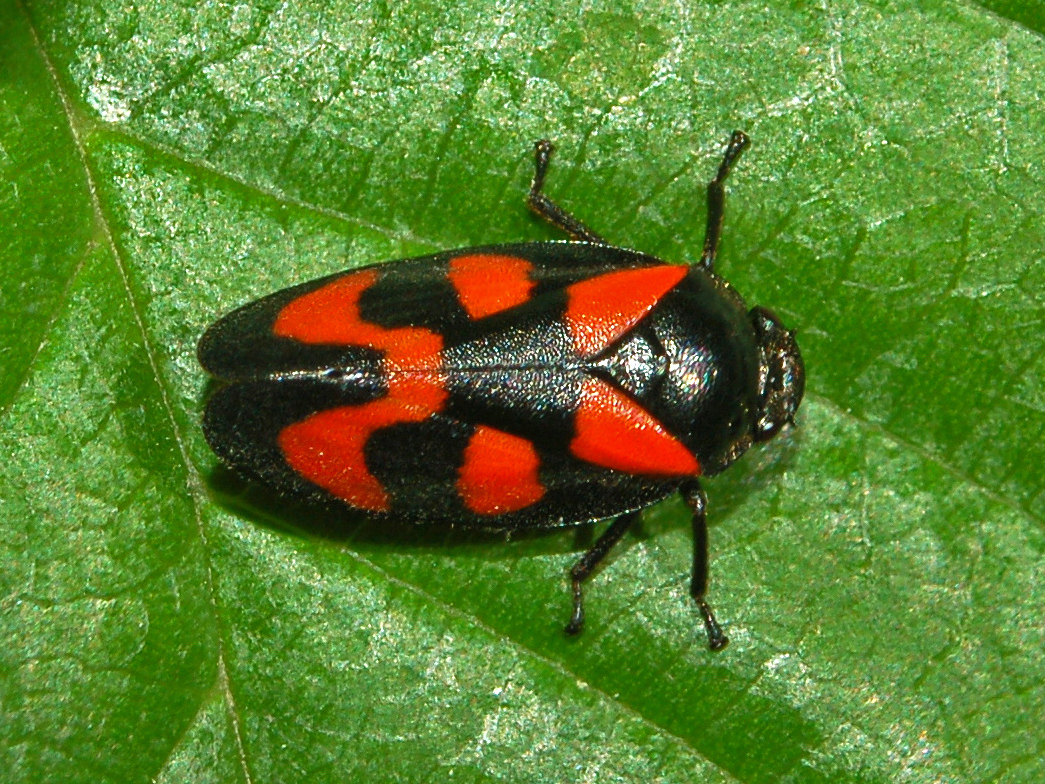
- Cercopis vulnerata- upperside
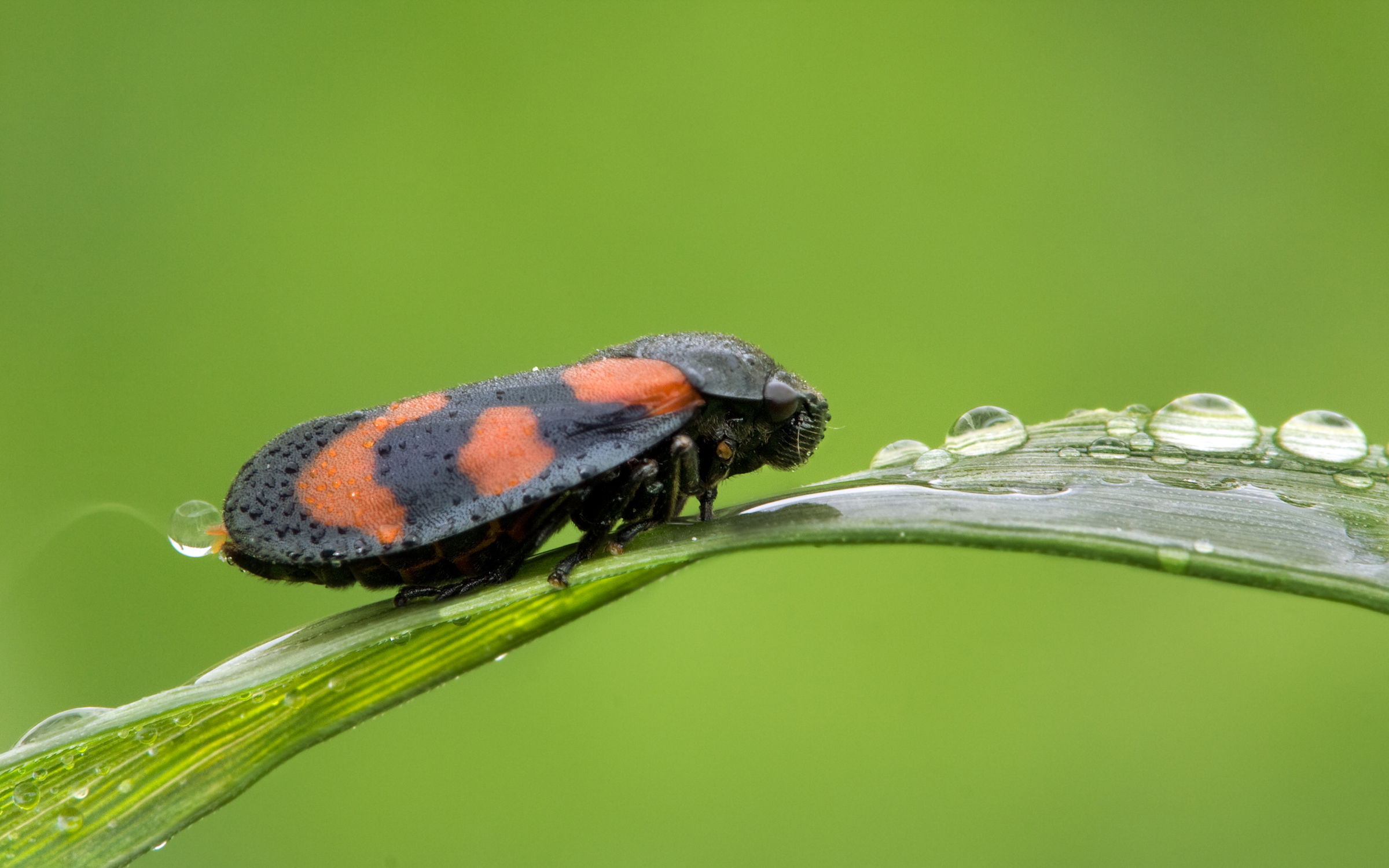
- Side view

Scientific classification
- Domain: Eukaryota
- Kingdom: Animalia
- Phylum: Arthropoda
- Class: Insecta
- Order: Hemiptera
- Suborder: Auchenorrhyncha
- Family: Cercopidae
- Genus: Cercopis
- Species: C. vulnerata

Binomial name
- Cercopis vulnerata Rossi, 1807

Synonyms
- Cercopis sanguinea (Geoffroy)

= Cercopis vulnerata =

Species of insect

Cercopis vulnerata (also known as the black-and-red froghopper or red-and-black froghopper) is a species of froghopper in the family Cercopidae.

== Distribution ==
This species is present in most of Europe (Albania, Austria, Belgium, Bulgaria, Serbia, Croatia, Czech Republic, France, Greece, Spain, the former Yugoslavia, Moldova, the Netherlands, Norway, Poland, Romania, Russia, Slovakia, Slovenia, Germany, Switzerland, Hungary, Great Britain and Italy).

== Habitat ==
These froghoppers inhabit sunny southern slopes of the mountains, grasslands, meadows, spruce forest edges, moors, verges, clearings and city parks. They can be found on woody or herbaceous plants, mainly in wooded areas.

== Description ==
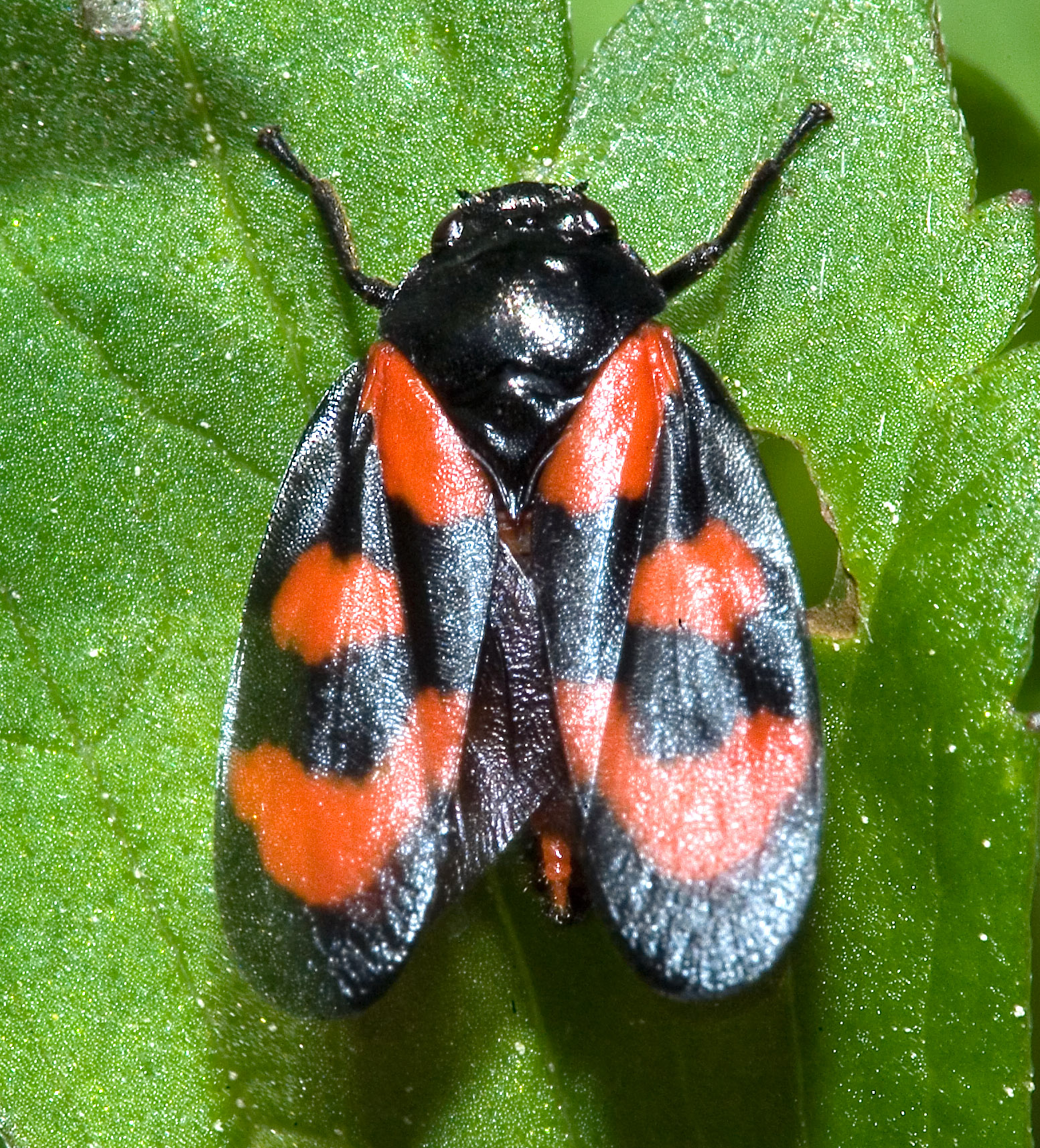
C. vulnerata. Open elytra

The male of Cercopis vulnerata is 8.9–10.5 millimetres (0.35–0.41 in) in length, and the female 8.2–10.5 millimetres (0.32–0.41 in). These froghoppers have an elongate and strongly shielded body. They are shining black, with bright red marks on the elytra, one triangular mark at the base, one square mark in the middle and a stripe at the apex. These colors serves as a warning of their unpleasant taste.

The hind wings are brownish, smoky and translucent. Upper abdomen is black with narrow red stripes at the rear extremities of the tergites.

This species is very similar to Cercopis sanguinolenta, but its red markings are larger and the rear stripe is U-shaped. Other rather similar species are Cercopis intermedia and Haematoloma dorsata.

== Biology ==
Cercopis vulnerata in copula

Adults can be found from April to August. They are polyphagous, mainly sucking vegetable juices of grasses, but also of other plants (Arrhenatherum elatius, Dactylis glomerata, Urtica dioica, Filipendula ulmaria, Aegopodium podagraria, etc.),

They can easily fly and are also equipped with very effective saltatory back legs, allowing jumps of up to 70 centimeters. They can extend their hindlegs in under a millisecond to execute a jump, implying elastic storage of energy for sudden release.

When they mate Cercopis male and female stay side by side with an angle of less than 45°. The female lays eggs at the end of summer in plants and trees that overwinter. Larvae live underground on the roots of various plants, inside a typical foam nest, that protects them from dehydration and against enemies. The nymph sucks vegetable juices out of the roots of the host plants. The nymph comes up in spring.
