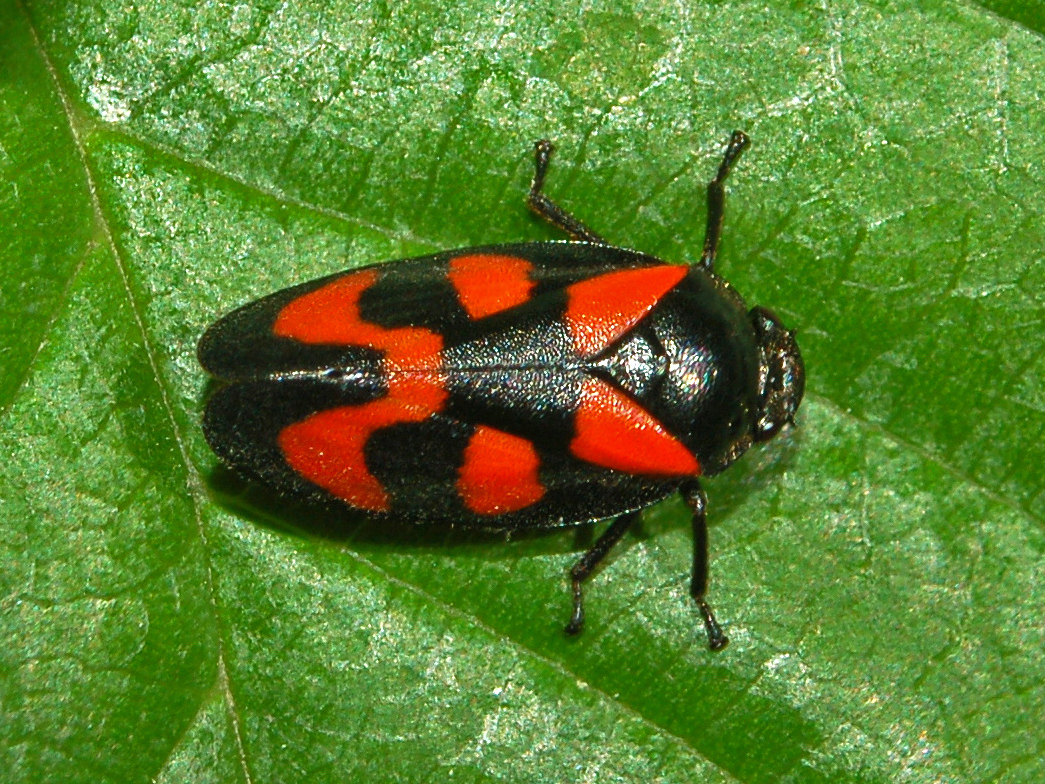
- Cercopis vulnerata

Scientific classification
- Domain: Eukaryota
- Kingdom: Animalia
- Phylum: Arthropoda
- Class: Insecta
- Order: Hemiptera
- Suborder: Auchenorrhyncha
- Family: Cercopidae
- Subfamily: Cercopinae
- Genus: Cercopis; Fabricius, 1775

Species
- see text

Synonyms
- Triecphora Amyot & Audinet-Serville, 1843

= Cercopis =

Genus of insects

Cercopis is a genus of froghoppers belonging to the family Cercopidae, distributed primarily in the Palearctic. At least one species, C. vulnerata, can be a pest to agriculture. There are over 30 accepted species.

== Selected species ==
- Cercopis arcuata Fieber, 1884
- Cercopis intermedia Kirschbaum, 1868
- Cercopis sabaudiana Lallemand, 1949
- Cercopis sanguinolenta (Scopoli, 1763)
- Cercopis vulnerata Rossi, 1807
