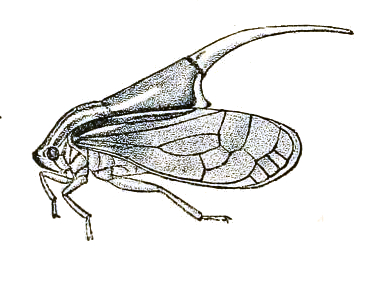
- Machaerota ensifera

Scientific classification
- Kingdom: Animalia
- Phylum: Arthropoda
- Clade: Pancrustacea
- Class: Insecta
- Order: Hemiptera
- Suborder: Auchenorrhyncha
- Infraorder: Cicadomorpha
- Superfamily: Cercopoidea
- Family: Machaerotidae; Stål, 1866

= Machaerotidae =

Family of true bugs

Machaerotidae are a family of bugs in the superfamily Cercopoidea which were formerly placed within Cercopidae. They are sometimes called tube-forming spittle-bugs as the nymphs form a calcareous tube within which they live. These bugs are mainly found in the Old World tropics. The adults of many genera have a long, free and spine-like process originating from the scutellum and thus superficially similar to the tree-hoppers, Membracidae. The tegmen or forewing, like typical bugs of the suborder Heteroptera, always has a distinct, membranous apical area.

Like other cercopoids, these are xylem-sap feeders. The nymph extracts calcium from the xylem fluid and constructs a calcareous tube from Malphigian gland secretions. They typically feed on woody dicots and immerse themselves in a rather clear fluid excretion inside the tube. The tubes strongly resemble the shells of certain serpulid sea worms or helicoid land snails and contain no less than 75% calcium carbonate. This habit is quite uncommon in the class Insecta and markedly different from that of typical spittlebugs, which make and live in a froth mass. Machaerotids produce foam only when they emerge from the tube to moult. There are about 115 species in 31 genera placed in 4 tribes. The majority of species are found in Southeast Asia with a small number in Africa. They were traditionally separated into two subfamilies; Machaerotinae which have the scutellar spine, and Enderleiniinae which lack it. A third subfamily, also lacking the spine, Apomachaerotinae, was recognized in 2014. The scutellum has a "tail" or appears raised towards the posterior end.

- - Membracoidea
  - - Cicadoidea
    - Cercopoidea
      - - Machaerotidae
        - Clastopteridae
      - - Cercopidae
        - Aphrophoridae (including Epipygidae)

Relationships with other groups.

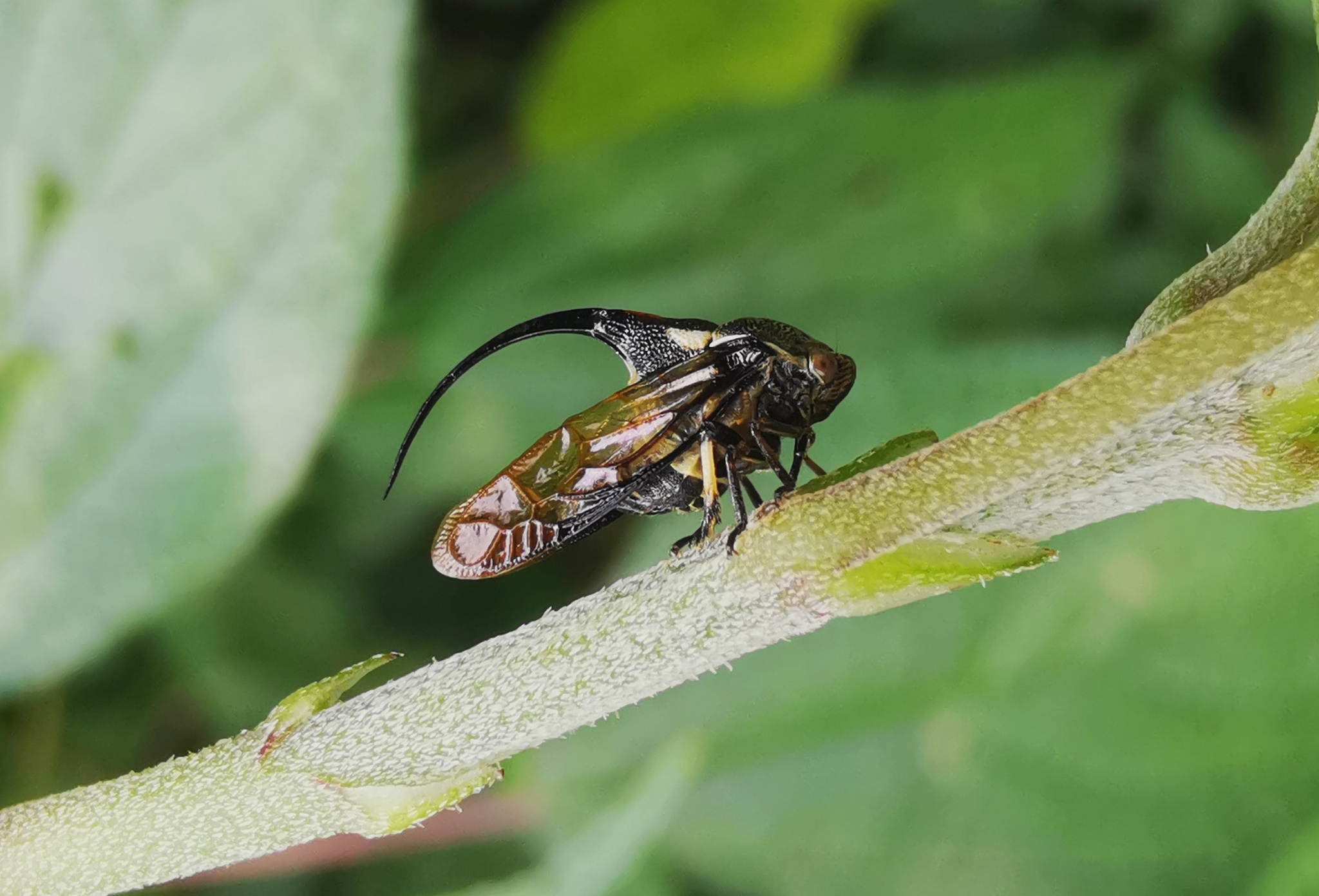
Romachaeta brachynotum, Thailand.

A list of the subfamilies, tribes and genera is as follows:

- Apomachaerotinae
  - Apomachaerota Schmidt, 1907
  - Serreia Baker, 1927
- Machaerotinae
  - Maxudeini
    - Blastacaen Maa, 1963
    - Conditor Distant, 1916
    - Maxudea Schmidt, 1907
  - Machaerotini
    - Dianmachaerota Nie & Liang, 2009
    - Grypomachaerota Schmidt, 1907
    - Irridiculum Hamilton, 2014
    - Machaerota Burmeister, 1835
    - Platymachaerota Schmidt, 1918
    - Romachaeta Maa, 1963
    - Sigmasoma Schmidt, 1907
    - Tapinacaena Maa, 1963
- Enderleiniinae
  - Hindoloidini
    - Aphrosiphon China, 1935
    - Hindoloides Distant, 1915
    - Kyphomachaerota Bell & Cryan, 2013
    - Trigonurella Maa, 1963
  - Enderleiniini
    - Aecalusa Maa, 1963
    - Allox Hamilton, 2014
    - Chaetophyes Schmidt, 1981
    - Enderleinia Schmidt, 1907
    - Hindola Kirkaldy, 1900
    - Labramachaerota Bell & Cryan, 2013
    - Labrosyne Maa, 1963
    - Machaeropsis Melichar, 1903
    - Makiptyelus Maki, 1914
    - Neuroleinia Lallemand, 1936
    - Neuromachaerota Schmidt, 1912
    - Pectinariophyes Kirkaldy, 1906
    - Polychaetophyes Kirkaldy, 1906
    - Taihorina Schumacher, 1915
