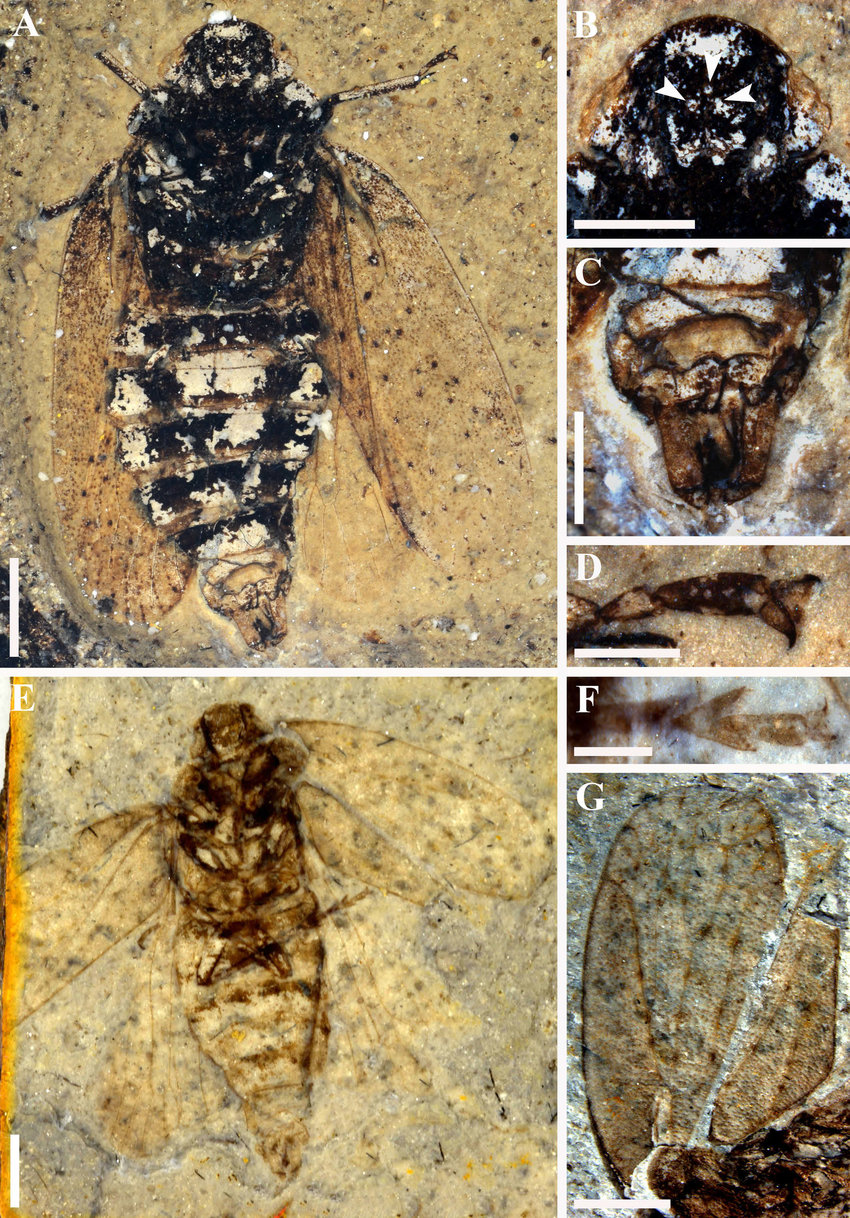
- Stictocercopis wuhuaensis

Scientific classification
- Kingdom: Animalia
- Phylum: Arthropoda
- Class: Insecta
- Order: Hemiptera
- Suborder: Auchenorrhyncha
- Superfamily: Cercopoidea
- Family: †Sinoalidae; Wang and Szwedo 2012

Genera
- See text

= Sinoalidae =

Sinoalidae Temporal range: Callovian–Cenomanian

Extinct family of true bugs

Sinoalidae is an extinct family of froghoppers known from the late Middle Jurassic to the early Late Cretaceous of Asia. They are one of two main Mesozoic families of froghoppers, alongside Procercopidae, unlike Procercopidae, Sinoalidae is thought to be an extinct side branch and not ancestral to modern froghoppers. Sinoalids have a temporally disjunct distribution being only known from the late Middle Jurassic (Callovian) Yanliao Biota of Inner Mongolia and the early Late Cretaceous (Cenomanian) aged Burmese amber of Myanmar, separated by over 60 million years. The family is "recognized by its tegmen with the costal area and clavus commonly more sclerotized and punctate than the remaining part, and its hind tibia with two rows of lateral spines"

== Genera ==
Taxonomy based on Chen et al., 2019

- †Cretosinoala Fu and Huang 2019 Burmese amber, Myanmar, Cenomanian
- †Hebeicercopis Hong 1983 Jiulongshan Formation, China, Callovian
- †Huabeicercopis Hong 1983 Jiulongshan Formation, China, Callovian
- †Jiania Wang and Szwedo 2012 Daohugou, China, Callovian
- †Jiaotouia Chen and Wang 2018 Burmese amber, Myanmar, Cenomanian
- †subfamily Juroalinae Chen and Wang 2019
  - †Chengdecercopis Hong 1983 Jiulongshan Formation, China, Callovian
  - †Juroala Chen and Wang 2019 Daohugou, China, Callovian
  - †Stictocercopis Fu and Huang 2018 Daohugou, China, Callovian
- †Luanpingia Hong 1983 Daohugou, Jiulongshan Formation, China, Callovian
- †Makrosala Chen and Wang 2020 Burmese amber, Myanmar, Cenomanian
- †Mesodorus Chen and Wang 2019 Burmese amber, Myanmar, Cenomanian
- †Mesolongicapitis Chen et al. 2019 Burmese amber, Myanmar, Cenomanian
- †Ornatiala Chen et al. 2019 Burmese amber, Myanmar, Cenomanian
- †Paraornatiala Fu and Huang 2019 Burmese amber, Myanmar, Cenomanian
- †Parasinoala Fu and Huang 2018 Daohugou, China, Callovian
- †Shufania Chen et al. 2017 Daohugou, China, Callovian
- †subfamily Sinoalinae Wang and Szwedo 2012
  - †tribe Fangyuanini Chen and Wang 2019
    - †Fangyuania Chen et al. 2018 Burmese amber, Myanmar, Cenomanian
  - †tribe Sinoalini Wang and Szwedo 2012
    - †Sinoala Wang and Szwedo 2012 Daohugou, China, Callovian

== Images ==
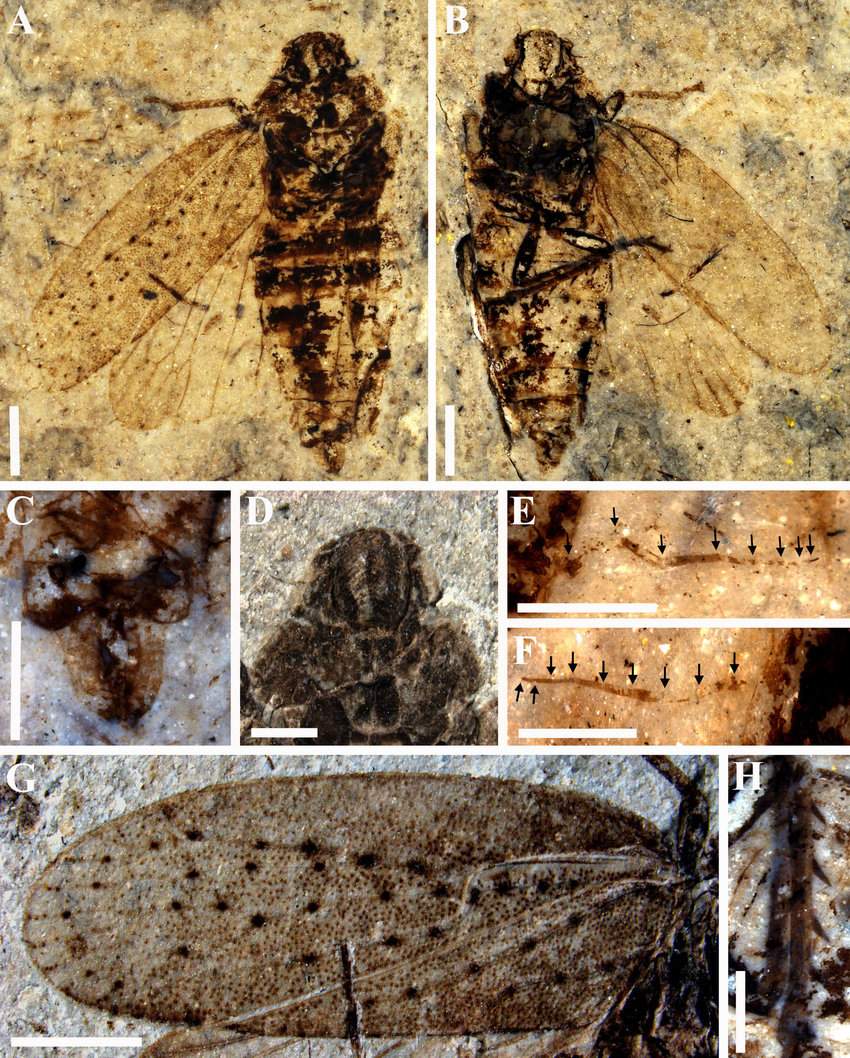
Stictocercopis wuhuaensis holotype
