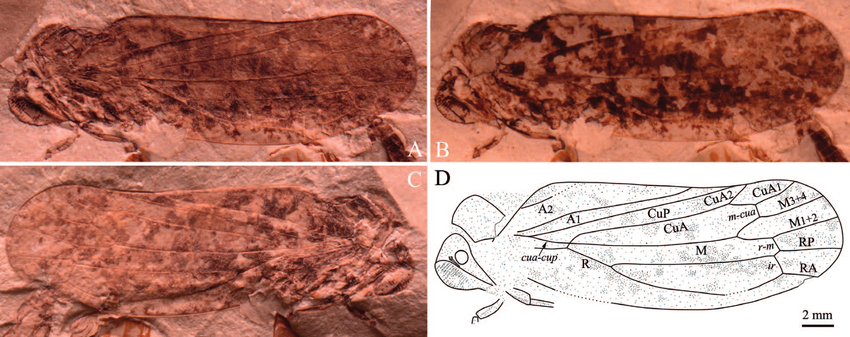
- Holotype specimen of Anthoscytina elegans

Scientific classification
- Kingdom: Animalia
- Phylum: Arthropoda
- Clade: Pancrustacea
- Class: Insecta
- Order: Hemiptera
- Suborder: Auchenorrhyncha
- Superfamily: Cercopoidea
- Family: †Procercopidae; Handlirsch 1906

Genera
- See text

= Procercopidae =

Procercopidae Temporal range: Hettangian–Campanian

Extinct family of true bugs

Procercopidae is an extinct family of froghoppers. They are known from the Early Jurassic to early Late Cretaceous of Eurasia. They are one of two main families of Mesozoic froghoppers alongside Sinoalidae. Procercopidae are considered to be the ancestral group from which modern froghoppers are derived.

== Taxonomy ==
Chen et al, 2020 found that the family was paraphyletic with respect to extant froghoppers and the monotypic family Cercopionidae known from the Aptian aged Crato Formation of Brazil.

- †Anomoscytina Ren et al. 1998 Yixian Formation, China, Aptian
  - †Anomoscytina anomala Ren et al. 1998
- †Anthoscytina Hong 1983
  - †Anthoscytina brevineura Chen et al. 2015 Daohugou, China, Callovian
  - †Anthoscytina daica Shcherbakov 1988 Glushkovo Formation, Russia, Tithonian-Early Cretaceous
  - †Anthoscytina daidaleos Fu et al. 2018 Daohugou, China, Callovian
  - †Anthoscytina elegans Chen et al. 2015 Daohugou, China, Callovian
  - †Anthoscytina hongi Chen et al. 2015 Haifanggou Formation, China, Callovian
  - †Anthoscytina liugouensis Hong 1983 Jiulongshan Formation, China, Callovian
  - †Anthoscytina longa Hong 1983 Haifanggou Formation, China, Callovian
  - †Anthoscytina parallelica Ren 1995 Jiulongshan Formation, China, Callovian
  - †Anthoscytina perpetua Li et al. 2013 Daohugou, China, Callovian
  - †Anthoscytina reducta Becker-Migdisova 1949 Kyzyl-Kiya, Kyrgyzstan, Pliensbachian
- †Burmocercopis Fu et al. 2019 Burmese amber, Myanmar, Cenomanian
  - †Burmocercopis lingpogensis Fu et al. 2019
- †Cretocercopis Ren 1995 Lushangfen Formation, China, Aptian
  - †Cretocercopis yii Ren 1995
- †Dongbeicercopis Chen et al. 2026 Nenjiang Formation, China, Santonian–Campanian
  - †Dongbeicercopis ganhensis Chen et al. 2026
- †Jurocercopis Wang and Zhang 2009 Daohugou, China, Callovian
  - †Jurocercopis grandis Wang and Zhang 2009
- †Paranthoscytina Fu et al. 2019 Burmese amber, Myanmar, Cenomanian
  - †Paranthoscytina xiai Fu et al. 2019
- †Procercopina Martynov 1937
  - †Procercopina asiatica Martynov 1937 Kyzyl-Kiya, Kyrgyzstan, Pliensbachian
  - †Procercopina delicata Zhang et al. 2003 Badaowan Formation, China, Sinemurian
  - †Procercopina frenzeli Ansorge 1996 Green Series, Germany, Toarcian
  - †Procercopina longipennis Becker-Migdisova 1962 Dzhil Formation, Kyrgyzstan Hettangian/Sinemurian
  - †Procercopina shawanensis Zhang et al. 2003 Badaowan Formation, China, Sinemurian
- †Procercopis Handlirsch 1906
  - †Procercopis abscissa Bode 1953 Posidonia Shale, Germany, Toarcian
  - †Procercopis alutacea Handlirsch 1906 Green Series, Germany, Toarcian
  - †Procercopis completa Bode 1953 Posidonia Shale, Germany, Toarcian
  - †Procercopis coriacea Handlirsch 1939 Green Series, Germany, Toarcian
  - †Procercopis debilis Bode 1953 Posidonia Shale, Germany, Toarcian
  - †Procercopis jurassica Geinitz 1884 Green Series, Germany, Toarcian
  - †Procercopis lacerata Bode 1953 Posidonia Shale, Germany, Toarcian
  - †Procercopis liasina Handlirsch 1906 Green Series, Germany, Toarcian
  - †Procercopis similis Handlirsch 1939 Green Series, Germany, Toarcian
  - †Procercopis wunnenbergi Bode 1953 Posidonia Shale, Germany, Toarcian
- †Sinocercopis Hong 1982
  - †Sinocercopis liaoyuanensis Hong 1982 Yixian Formation, China, Aptian
  - †Sinocercopis lushangfenensis Hong 1984 Lushangfen Formation, China, Aptian
  - †Sinocercopis macula Hu et al. 2014 Yixian Formation, China, Aptian
  - †Sinocercopis pustulosus Ren 1995 Lushangfen Formation, China, Aptian
  - †Sinocercopis trinervis Ren 1995 Lushangfen Formation, China, Aptian
- †Stellularis Chen et al. 2015 Yixian Formation, China, Aptian
  - †Stellularis aphthosa Ren et al. 1998
  - †Stellularis bineuris Chen and Wang 2020
  - †Stellularis longirostris Chen et al. 2015
  - †Stellularis minutus Chen and Wang 2020
  - †Stellularis senjituensis Hong 1984
  - †Stellularis sinuijuensis Jon et al. 2019 Sinuiju Formation, North Korea, Aptian
- †Titanocercopis Chen et al. 2015 Daohugou, China, Callovian
  - †Titanocercopis borealis Chen et al. 2015
- † Valdicopis Li, Chen and Jarzembowski, 2021, Wealden Group, Early Cretaceous
  - Valdicopis tonyi Li, Chen and Jarzembowski, 2021
