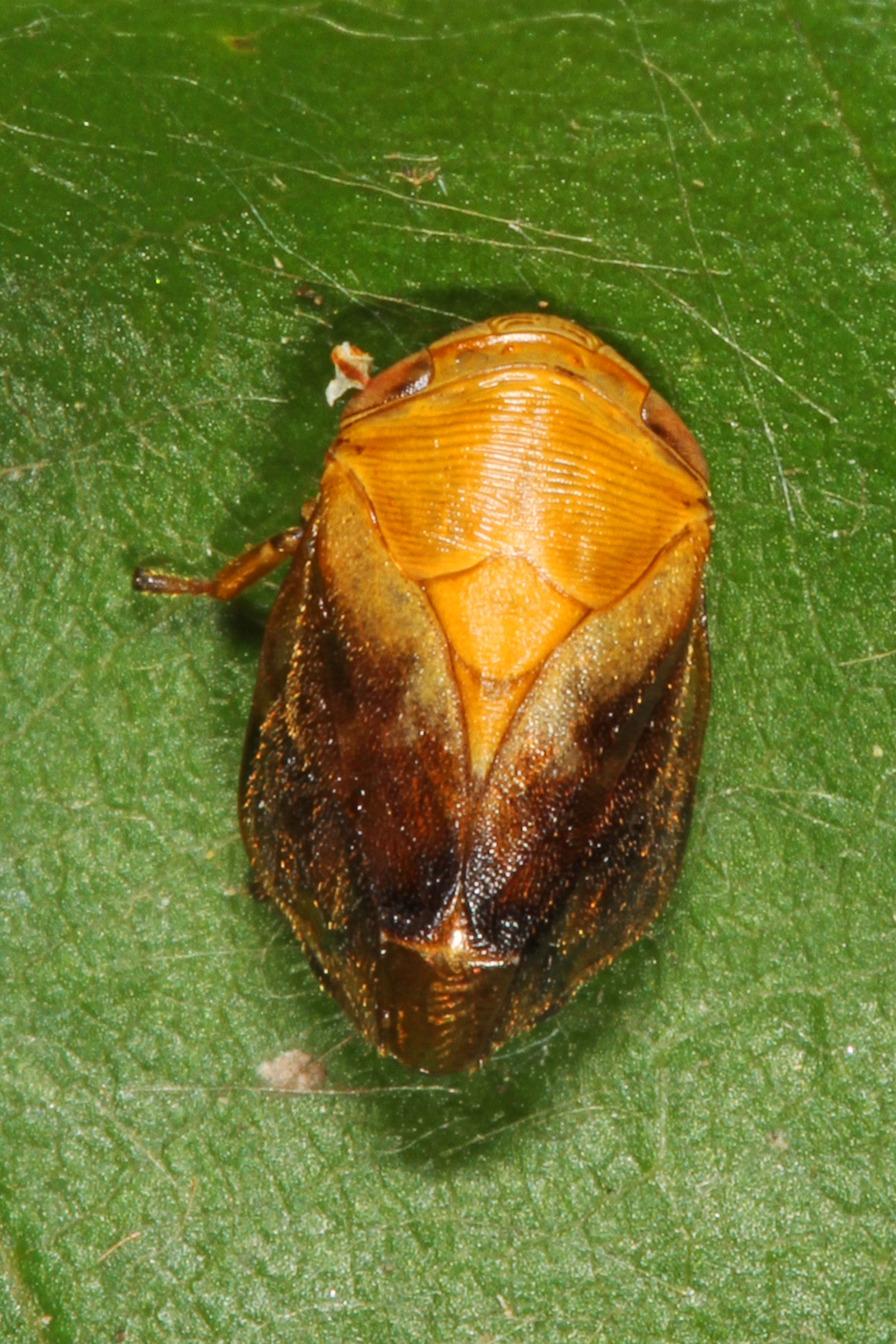
- Clastoptera achatina

Scientific classification
- Kingdom: Animalia
- Phylum: Arthropoda
- Clade: Pancrustacea
- Class: Insecta
- Order: Hemiptera
- Suborder: Auchenorrhyncha
- Family: Clastopteridae
- Subfamily: Clastopterinae
- Tribe: Clastopterini
- Genus: Clastoptera; Germar, 1839

= Clastoptera =

Genus of true bugs

Clastoptera is a genus of spittlebugs in the family Clastopteridae. There are at least 30 described species in Clastoptera.

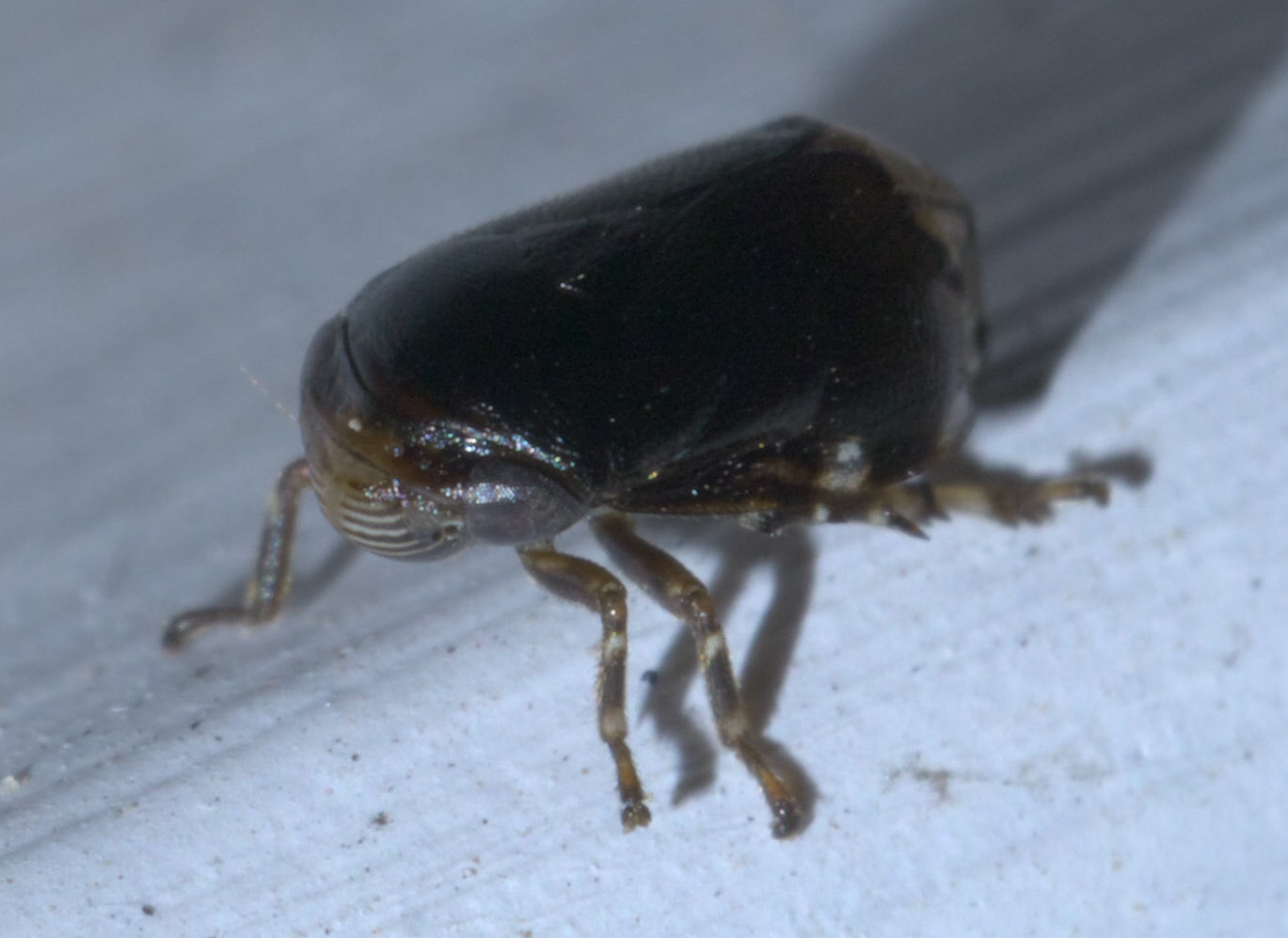
Clastoptera xanthocephala

== See also ==
- List of Clastoptera species
