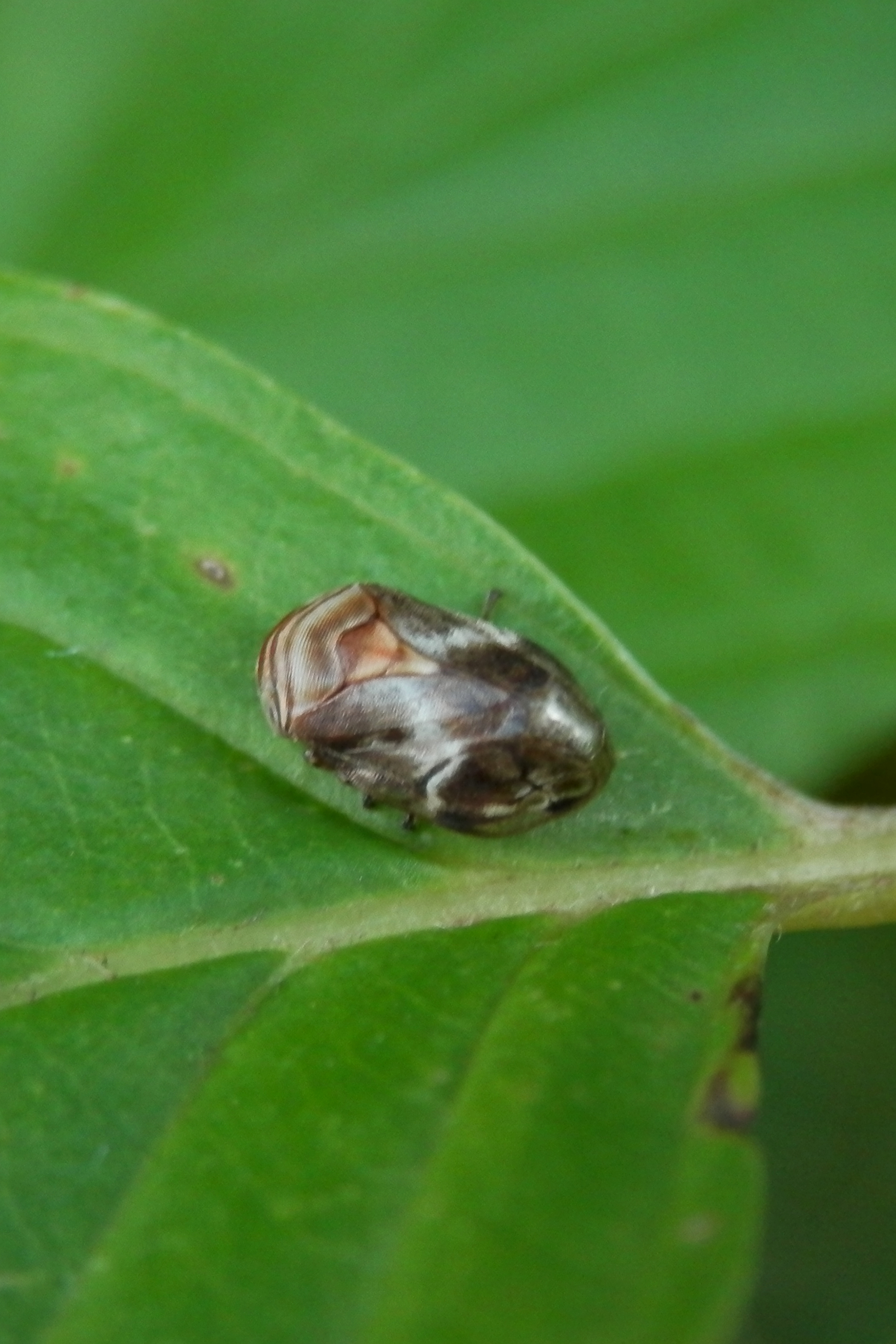
- Unidentified Clastoptera (Guelph, Canada)

Scientific classification
- Domain: Eukaryota
- Kingdom: Animalia
- Phylum: Arthropoda
- Class: Insecta
- Order: Hemiptera
- Suborder: Auchenorrhyncha
- Infraorder: Cicadomorpha
- Superfamily: Cercopoidea
- Family: Clastopteridae; Dohrn, 1859

= Clastopteridae =

Family of true bugs

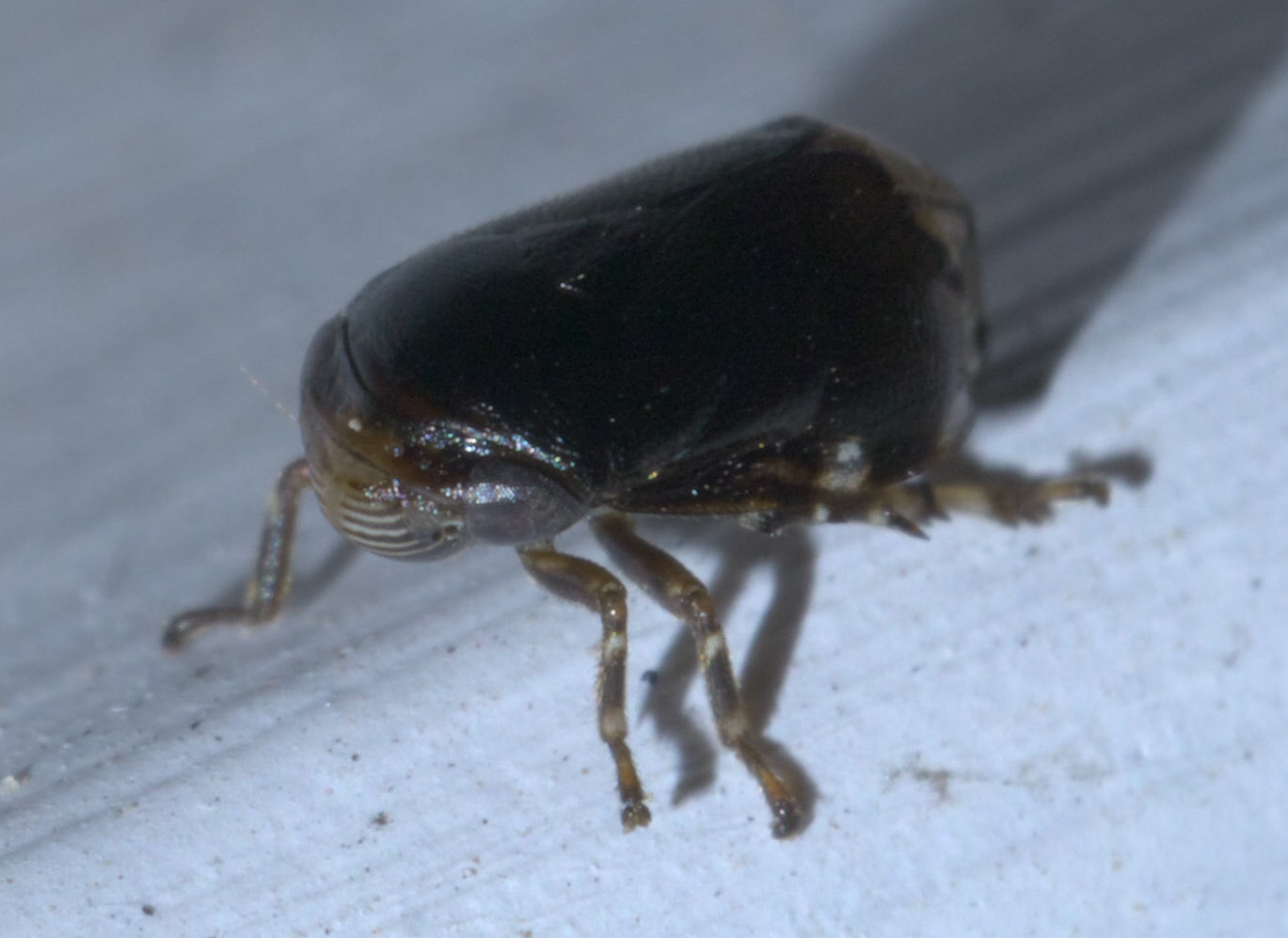
Clastoptera xanthocephala

Clastopteridae is a family of spittlebugs in the order Hemiptera. There are at least 10 genera and 100 described species in Clastopteridae.

== Genera ==
These 10 genera belong to the family Clastopteridae:

- Allox Hamilton, 2014
- Clastoptera Germar, 1839
- Hemizygon Hamilton, 2014
- Iba Schmidt, 1920
- Parahindoloides Lallemand, 1951
- Paropia Germar, 1833
- Pseudoclastoptera Hamilton, 2014
- Taphrotylus Hamilton, 2015
- Zygon Hamilton, 2014
- † Prisciba Poinar, 2014
