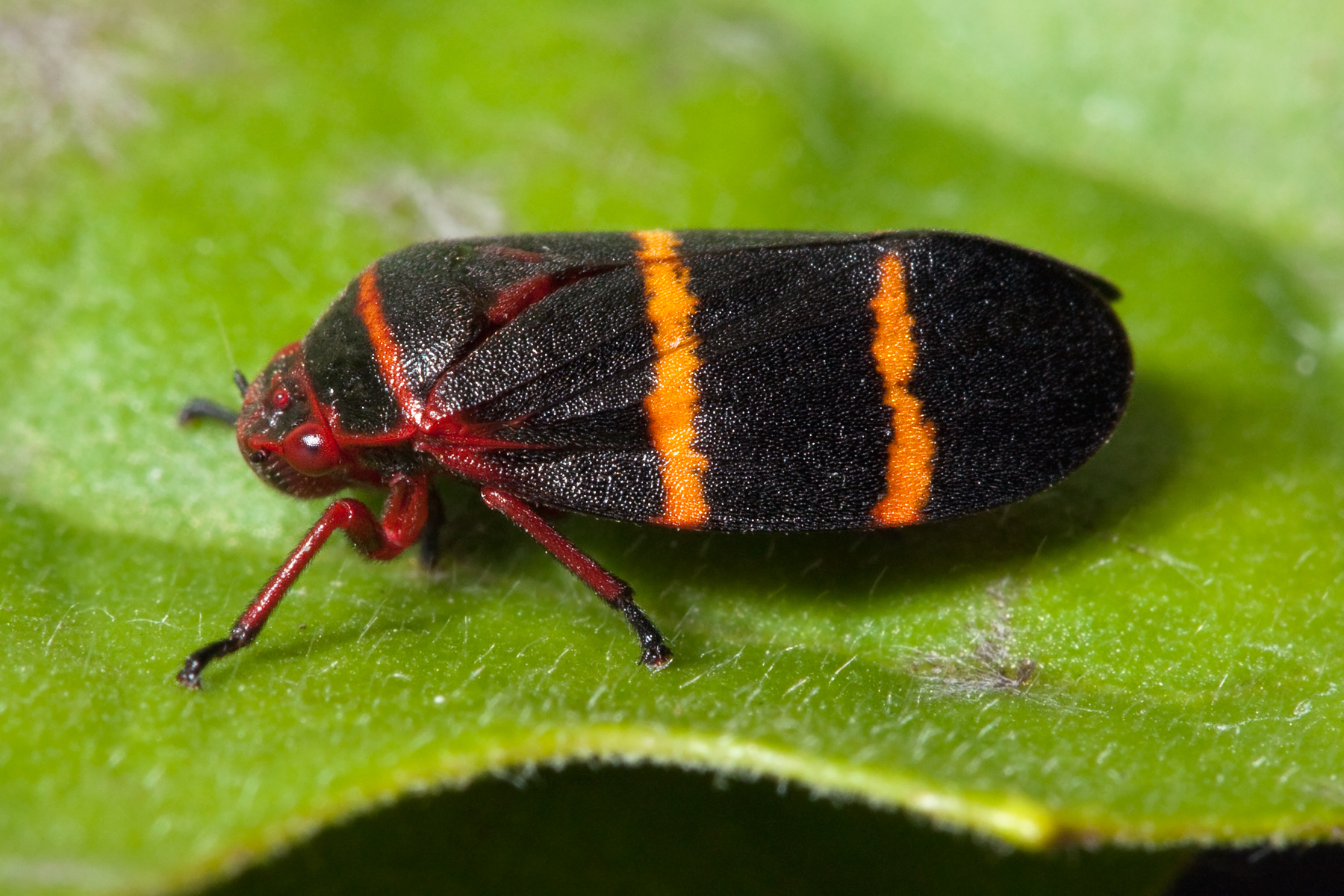
- Prosapia bicincta

Scientific classification
- Kingdom: Animalia
- Phylum: Arthropoda
- Clade: Pancrustacea
- Class: Insecta
- Order: Hemiptera
- Suborder: Auchenorrhyncha
- Infraorder: Cicadomorpha
- Superfamily: Cercopoidea; Leach, 1815

Families
- Aphrophoridae; Cercopidae; Clastopteridae; Ischnorhinidae; Machaerotidae; †Procercopidae; †Sinoalidae; †Myanmalidae

= Cercopoidea =

Froghopper Temporal range: Early Jurassic–Present

Superfamily of true bugs

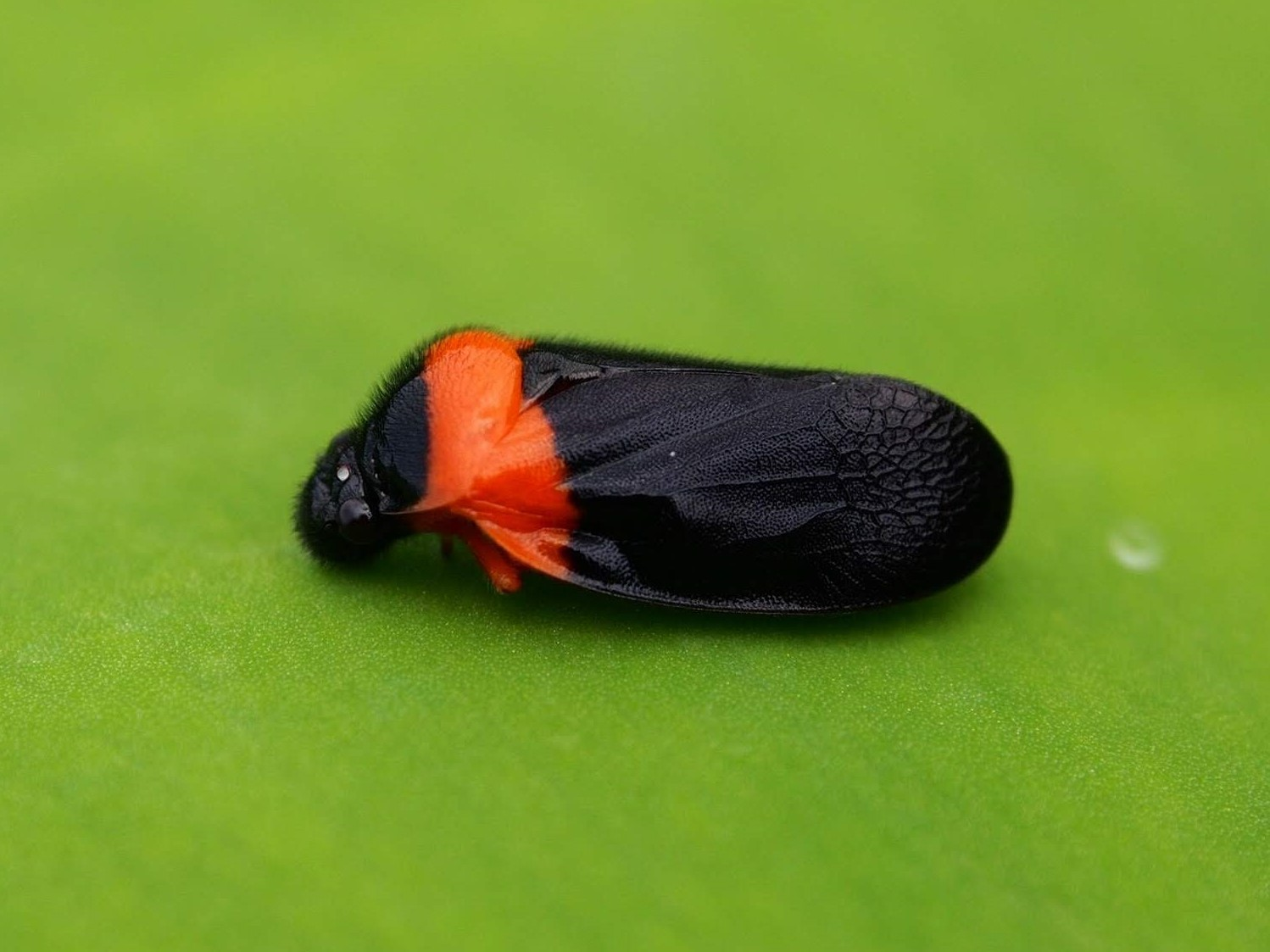
Phymatostetha deschampsi from India

The superfamily Cercopoidea, some members of which are called froghoppers and still others known as spittlebugs, are a group of hemipteran insects in the suborder Auchenorrhyncha. Adults are capable of jumping many times their height and length, giving the group their common name, but many species are best known for their plant-sucking nymphs which produce foam shelters, and are referred to as "spittlebugs".

== Taxonomy ==
- - Membracoidea
  - - Cicadoidea
    - Cercopoidea
      - - Machaerotidae
        - Clastopteridae
      - - Cercopidae
        - Aphrophoridae (incl. Epipyginae)

Relationships with other groups based on Cryan (2005).

Traditionally, most of this superfamily was considered a single family, the Cercopidae, but this family has been split into three families for many years now: the Aphrophoridae, Cercopidae, and Clastopteridae. The tribe Epipygini was removed from the Aphrophoridae and elevated to family rank in 2001, but four subsequent phylogenies all showed this lineage was firmly nested within Aphrophoridae (e.g.). More recently, in 2023, a phylogenetic analysis concluded that Cercopidae was not monophyletic, with the New World lineages representing the sister taxon to all other cercopoids, and accordingly raised from subfamily to family status as Ischnorhinidae in order to keep all of the cercopoid families monophyletic.

== Spittlebug nymphs ==
These families are best known for the nymphal stage, which produces a cover of foamed-up plant sap visually resembling saliva; the nymphs are therefore commonly known as spittlebugs and their foam as cuckoo spit, frog spit, or snake spit. This characteristic spittle production is associated with the unusual trait of xylem feeding. Whereas most insects that feed on sap feed on the nutrient-rich fluid from the phloem, Cercopidae utilize the much more diluted sap flowing upward from the roots via the xylem. The large amount of excess water that must be excreted and the evolution of special breathing tubes allow the young spittlebug nymphs to grow in the relatively protective environment of the spittle. Normally an animal should not be able to survive on a diet so low in nutrients, but the insects' digestive system contains symbiotic bacteria that provide them with the essential amino acids.

The foam serves a number of purposes. It hides the nymph from the view of predators and parasites, and it insulates against heat and cold, thus providing thermal control and also moisture control; without the foam, the insect would risk dehydration. The nymphs pierce plants and suck sap causing very little damage; much of the filtered fluids go into the production of the foam, which has an acrid taste, deterring predators. A few species are serious agricultural pests.

A small family in the group, the Machaerotidae, known as the tube spittlebugs, is an outlier among the Cercopoidea because the nymphs live in calcareous tubes rather than producing foam as in the other families.

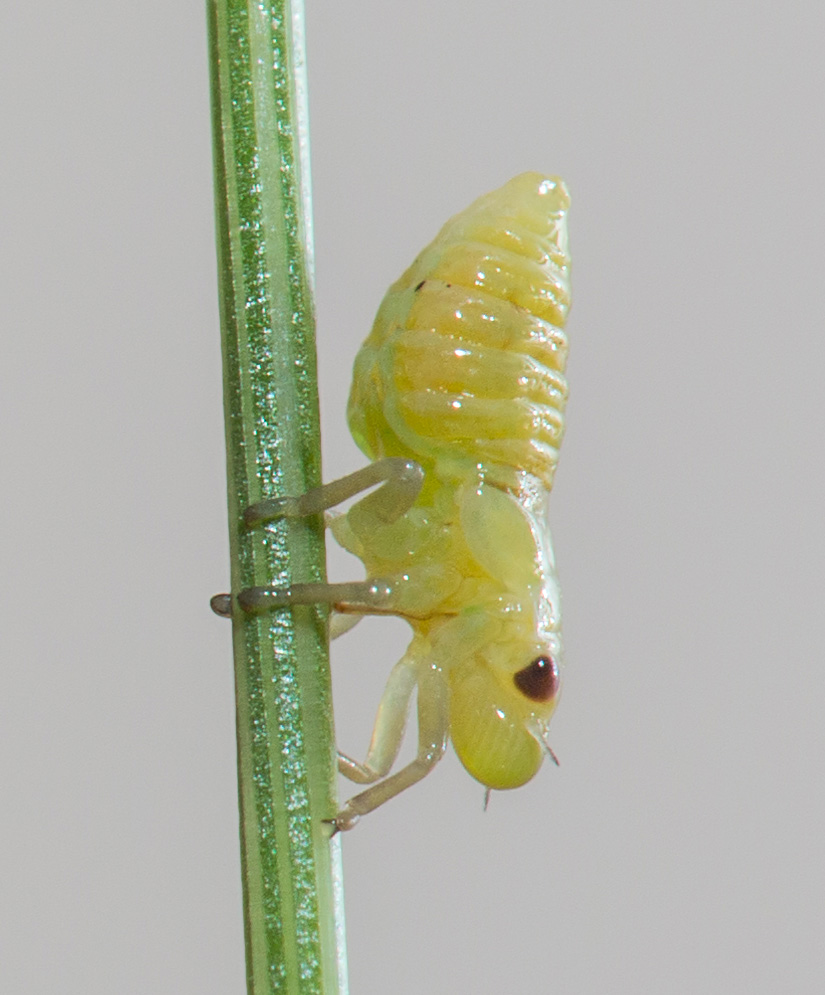
Spittlebug nymph

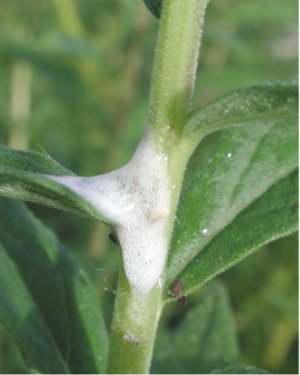
Spittlebug nymph surrounded by foam for protection and moisture

Spittlebug nymph reforming its protective bubble covering

== Adults ==
Adult froghoppers jump from plant to plant; some species can jump up to 70 cm (28 in) vertically: a more impressive performance relative to body weight than fleas. The froghopper can accelerate at 4,000 m/s^{2} (13,000 ft/s^{2}) over 2 mm (0.079 in) as it jumps (experiencing over 400 gs of acceleration). Spittlebugs can jump 100 times their own length.

Many species of froghopper resemble leafhoppers, but can be distinguished by the possession of only a few stout spines on the hind tibiae, where leafhoppers have a series of small spines. Members of the family Machaerotidae greatly resemble treehoppers, due to a large thoracic spine, but the spine in machaerotids is an enlargement of the scutellum, where treehoppers have the pronotum enlarged. Members of the family Clastopteridae have their wings modified to form false heads at the tail end, an antipredator adaptation. Many adult Cercopidae can bleed reflexively from their tarsi, and the hemolymph appears to be distasteful; they are often aposematically colored.

== Evolutionary history ==
The oldest froghoppers are known from the Early Jurassic. Mesozoic froghoppers are divided into two main families, Procercopidae known from the Early Jurassic to early Late Cretaceous of Asia, which are thought to be ancestral to living froghoppers, and Sinoalidae, which is known from the late Middle Jurassic and early Late Cretaceous of Asia. The genus Qibinius the Middle Jurassic Yanan Formation of China mixes characters of both families and cannot be assigned to either. The genus Cercopion from the Aptian aged Crato Formation of Brazil appears to be derived from the Procerocopidae and closely related to the crown group.
