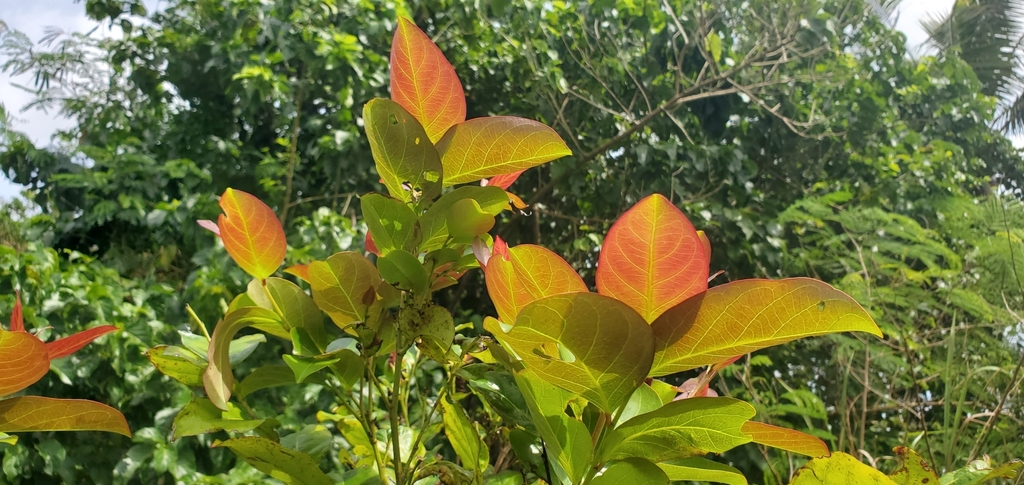

Scientific classification
- Kingdom: Plantae
- Clade: Embryophytes
- Clade: Tracheophytes
- Clade: Angiosperms
- Clade: Eudicots
- Clade: Rosids
- Order: Malpighiales
- Family: Phyllanthaceae
- Genus: Phyllanthus
- Species: P. mariannensis

Binomial name
- Phyllanthus mariannensis W.L.Wagner & Lorence

Synonyms
- Glochidion marianum Müll.Arg.

= Phyllanthus mariannensis =

Species of plant

Phyllanthus mariannensis (Chamorro: CHosgu or Åbas duendes; Pohnpeian: luhwikitoh lol) is a species of plant in the family Phyllanthaceae that is endemic to the islands of Guam and the Caroline Islands.

== Description ==
Phyllanthus mariannensis is a small shrubby tree, rarely up to 5 metres (16 ft), with trunks seldom over 10–20 cm (3.9–7.9 in) diameter.

- Leaves: glabrous, elliptical or oblong-elliptical simple leaves are 5–15 cm (2.0–5.9 in) long and 3–8 cm (1.2–3.1 in) broad. Leaves are arranged alternate distichous on the stems by short petioles (1–3 mm (0.039–0.118 in)). New leaves are red or deep scarlet, producing a crown with striking appearance when numerous; mature leaves are medium green, but more pale underneath.
- Wood: fine grained, tough, and red tinted.
- Flowers: Phyllanthus mariannensis is a monoecious tree, with separate male and female flowers on the same plant. Flowers are minuscule, and color pale yellow-green. Female calyx is longer than the male's. Calyx consists of 2 larger and 3 smaller sepals, but no petals. Male flowers have 3 short-columnar anthers. Female flowers have a mostly 5-locular glabrous ovary, with styles forming a slender subulate column.
- Fruits: Fruits are globose capsules, or slightly pentagonal, glabrous, with 5 (or sometimes 6) loculi. Immature capsules are light green, becoming yellow when mature, then dark brown. Each of the dehiscent locules contains 2 bright orange or orange-brown seeds. Fruits are said to resemble a mallow fruit or Dutch cheese.
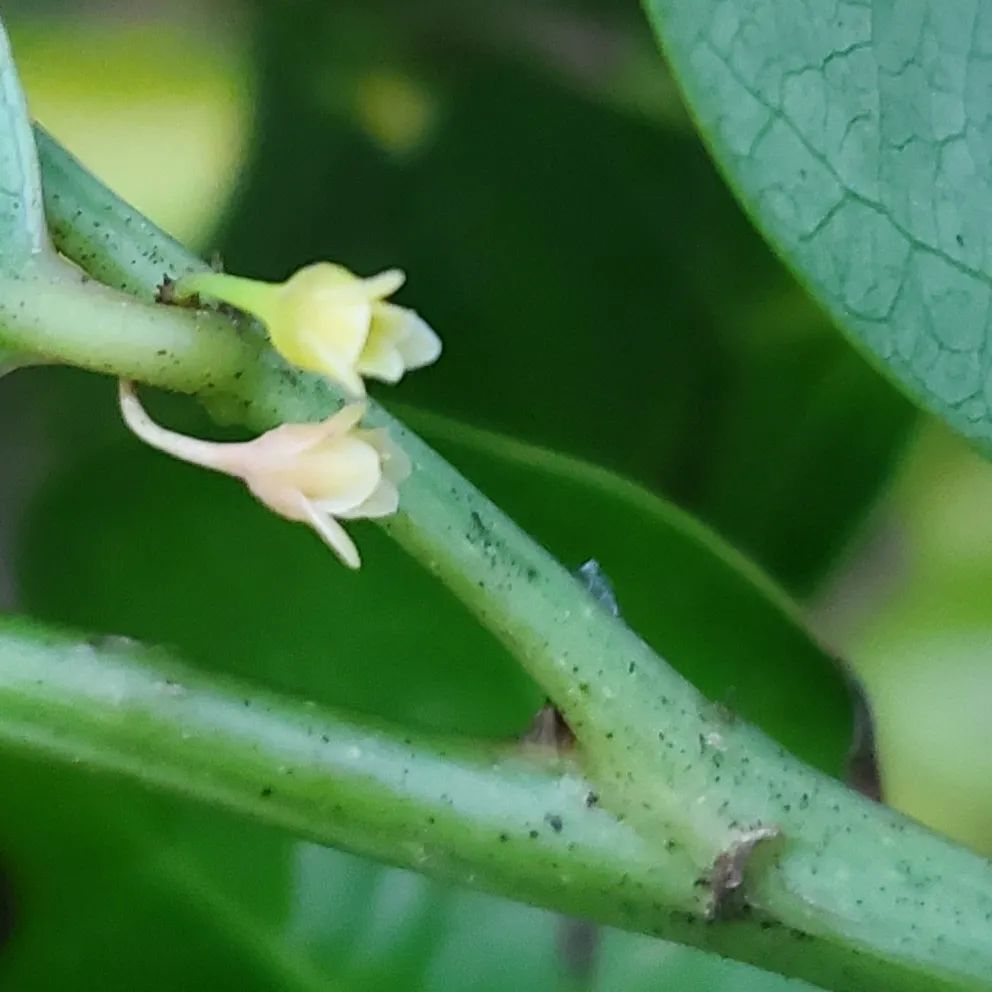
Minuscule flowers. Dededo, Guam

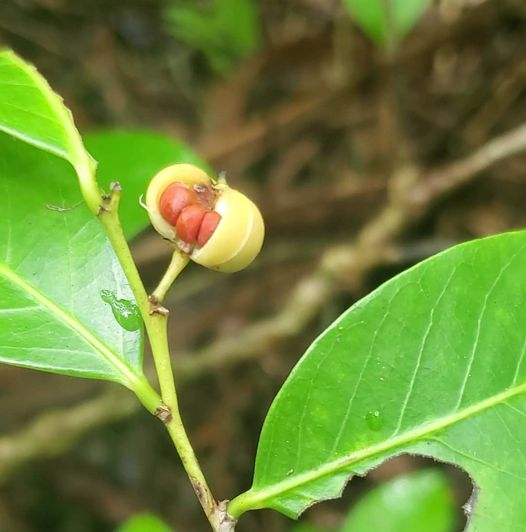
Seeds inside mature fruit. Dededo, Guam.

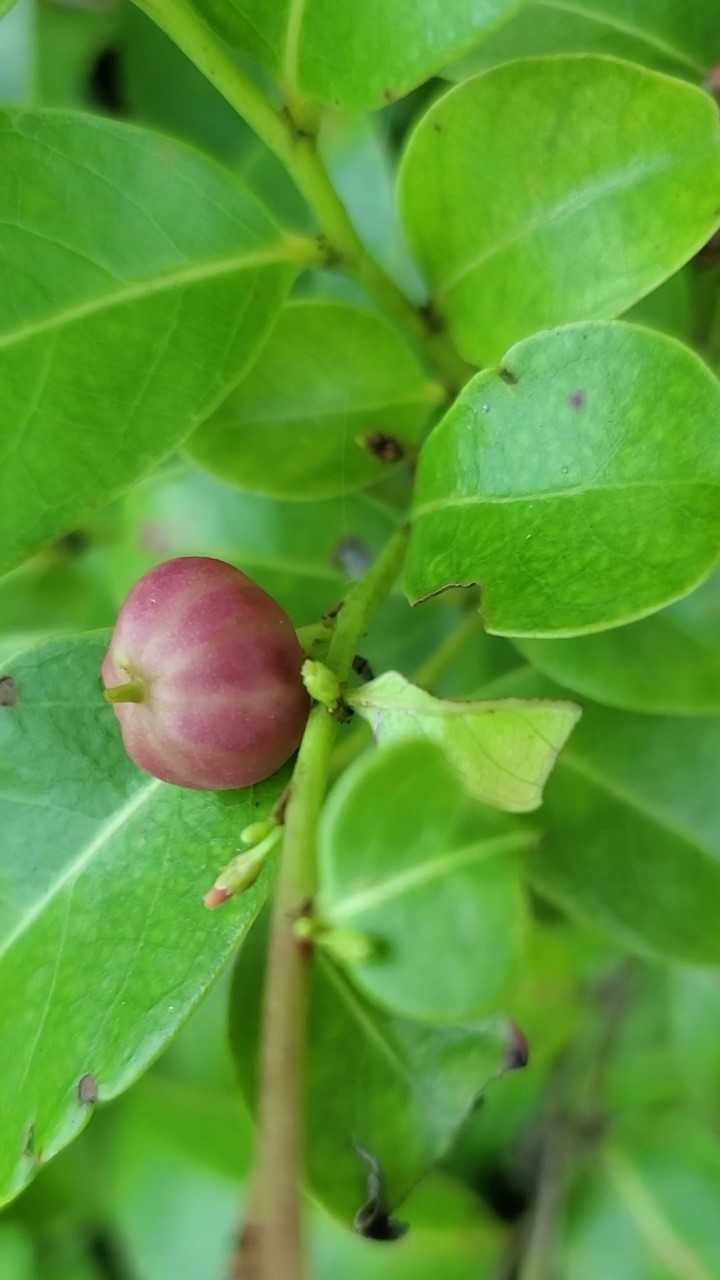
Unripe fruit. Dededo, Guam

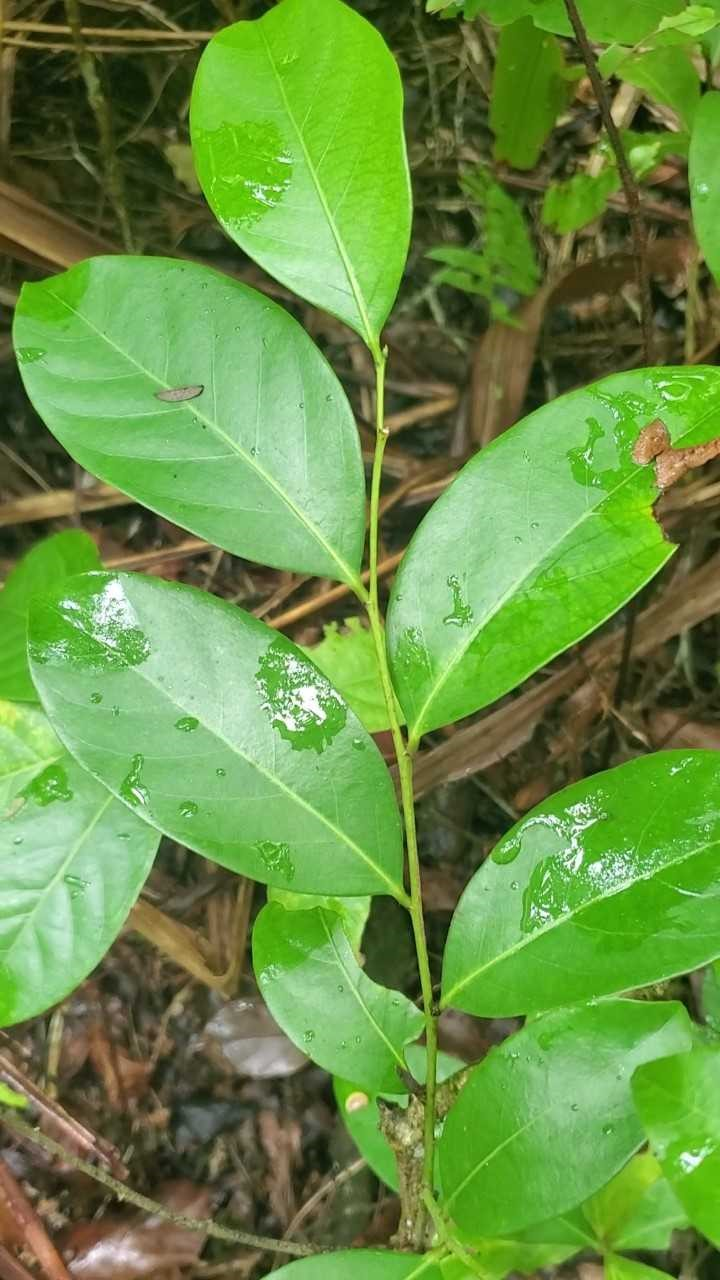
Stem and leaves. Dededo, Guam

== Distribution and habitat ==
Phyllanthus mariannensis grows both in the volcanic soils of southern Guam, as well as the limestone that is typical of northern Guam. However, no distinctive variants or regional differences have yet been described.

Phyllanthus mariannensis is noted to favor abandoned clearings and edges, as well as the open savannas of southern Guam, although it can also be found in the understory of the limestone forest.

== Ecology ==
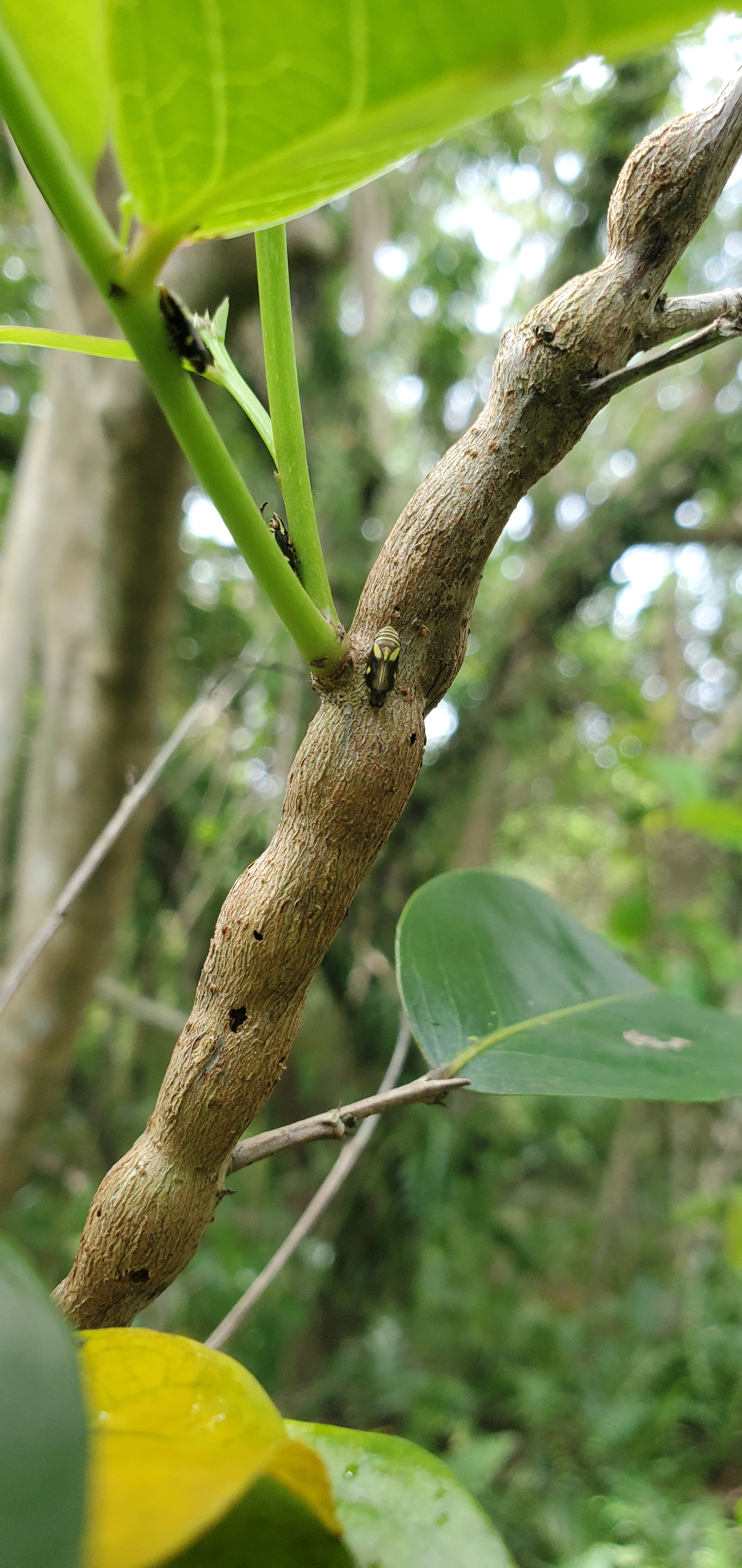
Stem of Phyllanthus mariannensis with stem galls with exit holes commonly seen on this species. On the stem is Lallemandana phalerata, an insect endemic to Micronesia and often seen on Phyllanthus mariannensis on Guam.

=== Invertebrates ===
Most Phyllanthus species are known to have a mutualistic relationship with moths of the genus Epicephala. However, no Epicephala moth has yet been described for Phyllanthus mariannensis.

Several species of insect have been recovered on Guam only from Phyllanthus mariannensis, mostly from collections before World War II:

- a jumping plant louse (Trioza guama)
- a true weevil (Swezeyella muscosa)
- a jewel beetle (Chrysodema ventralis)
- a leafhopper (Tartessus ochraceus)

Other insects endemic to the Mariana Islands that have been observed on Phyllanthus mariannensis on Guam include: a fungus weevil (Notioxenus fulgidus), a leaf beetle (Phytorus lineolatus), a bee (Halictus swezeyi), a bird grasshopper (Valanga excavata), a leafhopper (Tartessus swezeyi), a chalcid wasp (Cirrospiloideus guamensis), a true weevil (Trigonops inaequalis), a jewel bug (Calliphara munda),, a sap beetle (Haptognathus minutus), a spittlebug (Lallemandana phalerata) [author's observations], and two capsid bugs (Aretas signatus and Aretas bifasciatus).

=== Birds ===
Phyllanthus mariannensis is one of the many native plant species whose seeds are eaten by the Micronesian starling (Aplonis opaca).

== Conservation ==
In 1960, Raymond Fosberg described Phyllanthus mariannensis as being one of the more abundant trees in the ravine forests of southern Guam. In 1970, Benjamin Stone described it as being quite common, often as a volunteer in old fields.

As of 2024, the species has not been assessed by the IUCN.

== Uses ==
Edwin Safford wrote in 1905 that Phyllanthus mariannensis was used by the Chamorros of Guam to make cart shafts, as the wood is very strong.

Glochidion species are some of the most widespread medicinal plants used among the peoples of the Pacific, typically using the leaves and bark. However, no specific medicinal uses have been recorded from Guam.

== History and taxonomy ==
The French botanist, Charles Gaudichaud-Beaupré, extensively catalogued the flora of Guam during the 1819 expedition led by Louis de Freycinet. However, Gaudichaud's 1826 botanical report does not mention the species. Nevertheless, a specimen in the herbarium of Swiss botanist Augustin Pyramus de Candolle was attributed to Gaudichaud. It was first described in the scientific literature as Glochidion marianum in 1863 in the journal Linnaea, by Johannes Müller Argoviensis, the conservator of the de Candolle herbarium.

Argoviensis again described the species in the journal Flora in 1865, but moved it to the genus Phyllanthus, and changed the species name to Phyllanthus gaudichaudi, honoring Gaudichaud-Beaupréso, who first collected the species, and so as not to confuse it with the related species, Phyllanthus marianus. However, William Edwin Safford retained the original species name, Glochidion marianum Muell. Arg., in his 1905 description.

A 2006 evaluation of the genus Glochidion recommended it be subsumed under the genus Phyllanthus. Subsequently, Wagner and Lorence in 2011 recommended a reorganization based on molecular phylogenetic studies and morphological characteristics. They proposed separating Glochidion marianum into two species, naming Guam's species Phyllanthus mariannensis and the Caroline Islands species Phyllanthus senyavinianus. Plants of the World Online currently accepts both species.

== Common name ==
Although Gaudichaud meticulously recorded the Chamorro names of many of Guam's plants, the first record of the Chamorro name for Phyllanthus mariannensis appears to have been 1905 by American botanist William Edwin Safford, who recorded the spellings "chosgô" and "chosgû." The same spelling was applied by S.F. Glassman in 1948. The first reference to the plant as "chosga" appears to be from E.D. Merrill in 1914.

However, in 1970, Stone recorded the Chamorro names chosga, chosgo, and åbas duendes. The latter name in Chamorro means "guava of the duendes," referring to the diminutive spirits of Chamorro folklore. Since guava were introduced to the Marianas from the New World, åbas duendes would necessarily be a Spanish-era name.

Marjorie Falanruw lists the name of Phyllanthus mariannensis on Pohnpei as luhwikitoh lol. The more general term for Phyllanthus species on Palau is ngolm, iodel, or kesengelengolm; on Chuuk is afor or amoses; and on Yap is ngumal or ngumol.
