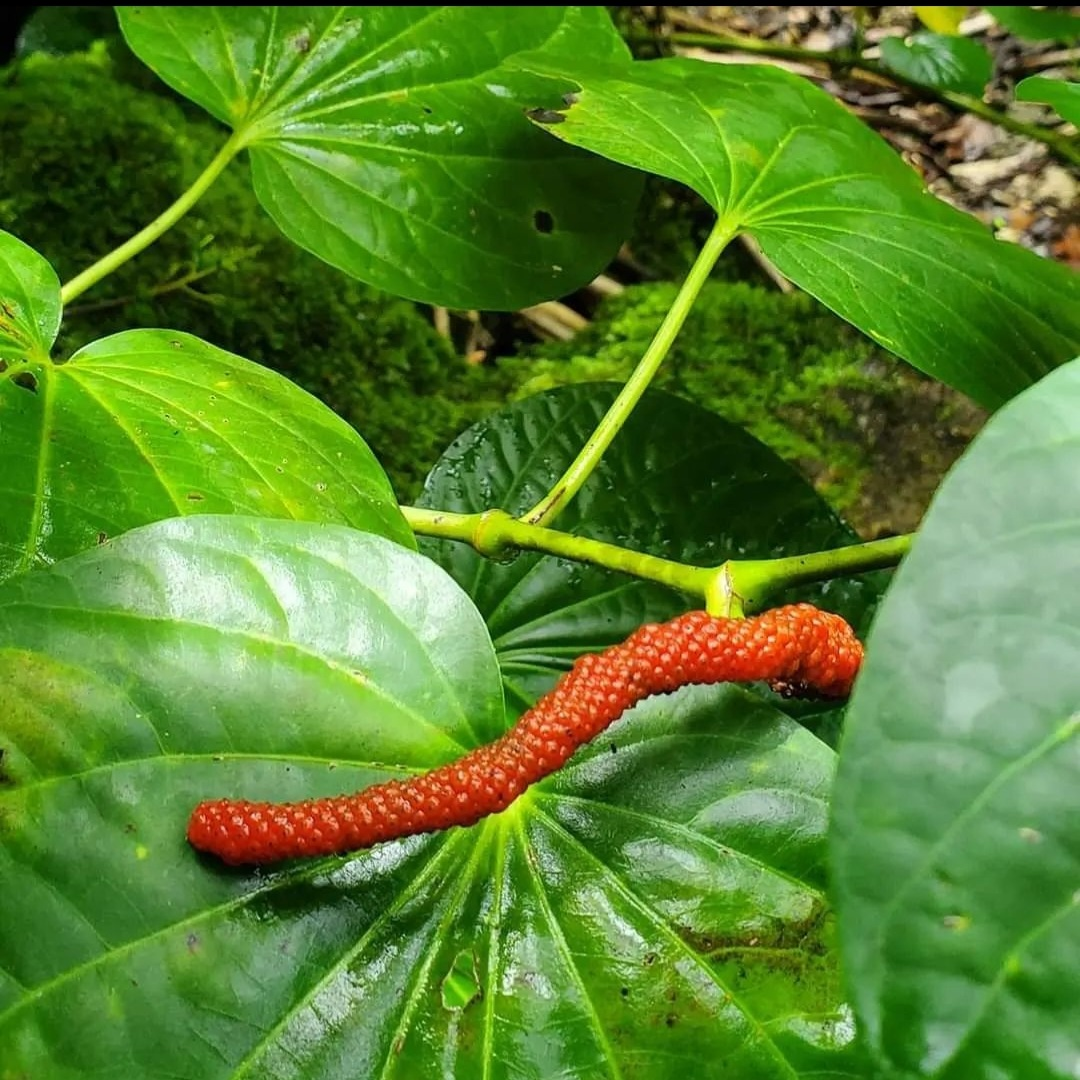

Scientific classification
- Kingdom: Plantae
- Clade: Tracheophytes
- Clade: Angiosperms
- Clade: Magnoliids
- Order: Piperales
- Family: Piperaceae
- Genus: Piper
- Species: P. guahamense

Binomial name
- Piper guahamense C.DC. (1869)

Synonyms
- Macropiper guahamense (C.DC.) A.C.Sm.; Macropiper guahamense f. glabrum (Yunck.) A.C.Sm.; Piper guahamense var. glabrum Yunck.

= Piper guahamense =

Species of flowering plant

Piper guahamense, the Guam pepper (Chamorro: pupulun aniti), is a plant in the family Piperaceae, and is endemic to the Mariana Islands.

== Description and habitat ==
P. guahamense morphologically resembles the kava pepper, and it has a similar aroma and taste. It is common in shady, moist forests and streamside.

== Taxonomy ==
Piper guahamense was first classified as being in the Macropiper genus by in 1839 by Dutch botanist Friedrich Miquel.

The name Piper guahamense was first recorded in 1869 in the 16th volume of Prodromus Systematis Naturalis Regni Vegetabilis by Swiss botanist, Alphonse Pyramus de Candolle. However, later authors grouped it into the narrower genus Macropiper, which consisted of only 9 species, all in the Pacific Ocean. The species is now subsumed under the large genus Piper.

== Ecology ==
Several species of insect have been recovered exclusively from Piper guahamense. The following is a list of endemic insects that are possibly host-specific. All were collected during a 1911 and 1936 entomological surveys of the island:

- a leafhopper (Batrachomorphus viridoflavidus) (collected from Dededo and Mt. Alifan on Guam)
- a leafhopper (Bythoscopus viridofiavidus) (collected from Dededo).
- a plant bug (Lygus fullawayi) (collected from Agiguan, Mt. Lasso on Tinian, and on Guam on Mt. Santa Rosa and Mt. Lamlam)
- a plant bug (Zanchius piperi) (collected only on Guam and apparently named after its host plant)

The following insects are endemic to the Marianas or Micronesia and have been observed on Piper guahamense and other plant species: a spittlebug (Lallemandana phalerata), a rove beetle (Palaminus swezeyi), an ant-like leaf beetle (Euglenes bifossicollis), a tumbling flower beetle (Mordellistena castanea), a chalcid wasp (Ooencyrtus swezeyi), three planthoppers (Tambinia guamensis, Ugyops samoaensis, and Capelopterum punctatellum), and four true weevils (Trigonops inusitata, Trigonops vulgaris, Daealus tuberosus, and Cryphalus swezeyi) (Elwood C. Zimmerman noted extensive perforations in the leaves of Piper guahamense due to Trigonops).

Non-endemic invertebrates collected from Piper guahamense include a plant bug (Creontiades pallidifer), a chalcicoid wasp (Spalangia endius), and a fungus weevil (Araecerus vieillardi).

== Gallery ==
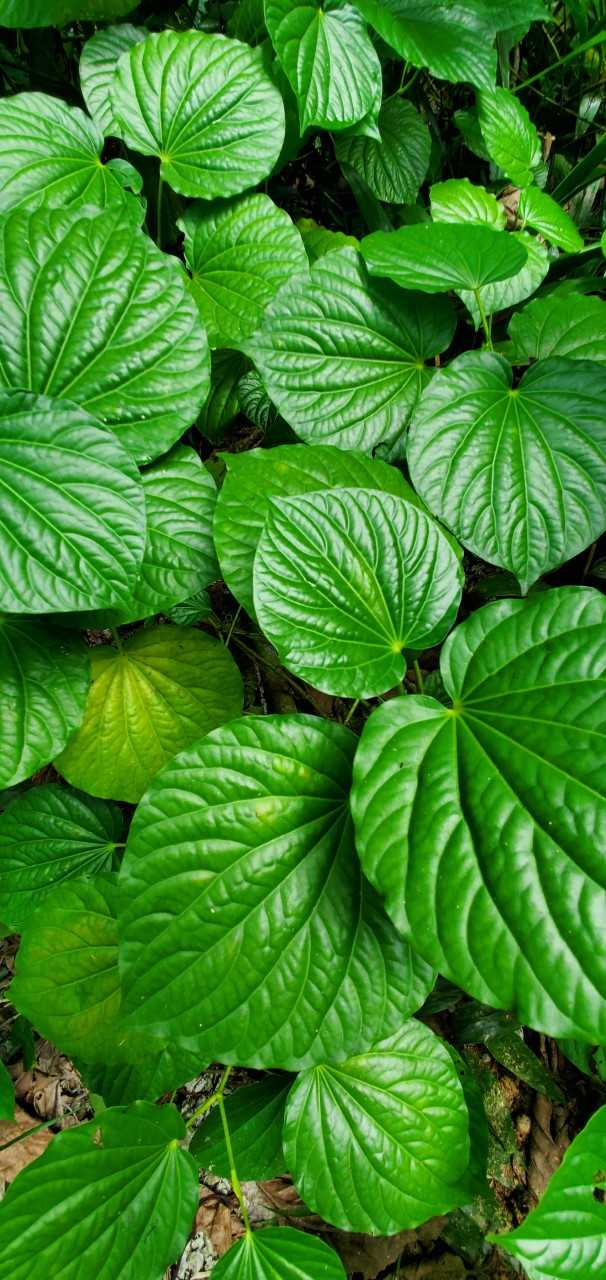
Foliage, Guam

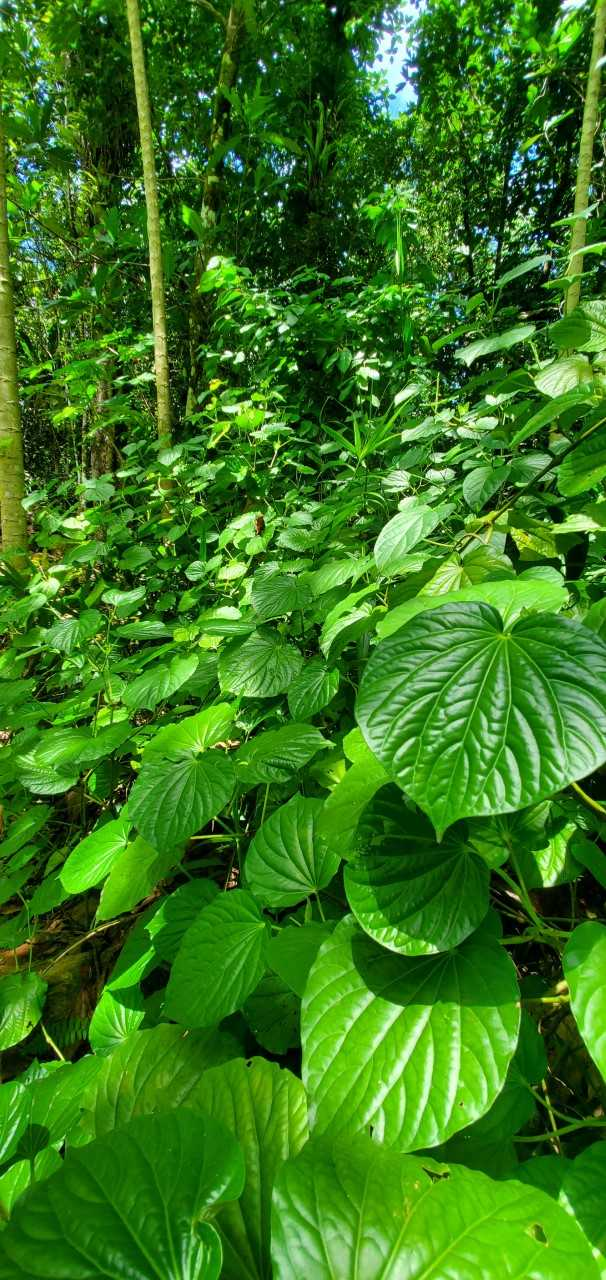
Growing in limestone forest understory, Guam

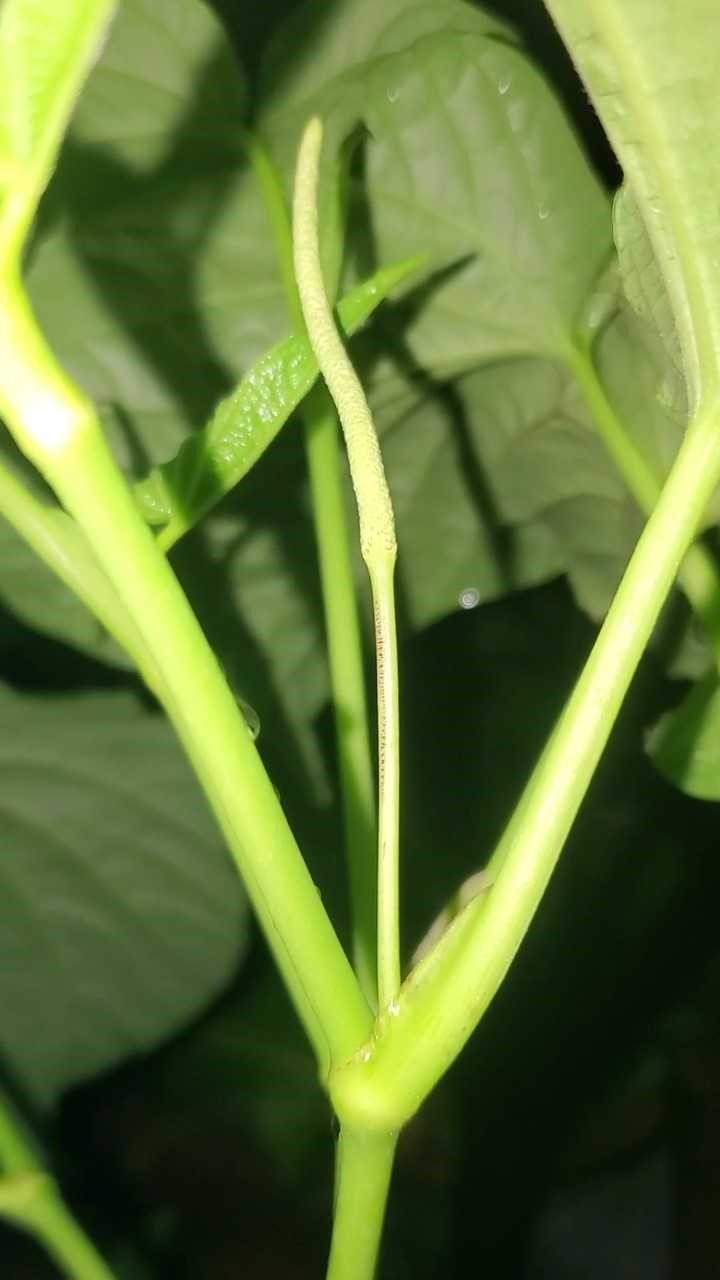
Immature fruit on spadix, Guam
