= Ermischiella =

Scientific classification
- Domain: Eukaryota
- Kingdom: Animalia
- Phylum: Arthropoda
- Class: Insecta
- Order: Coleoptera
- Suborder: Polyphaga
- Infraorder: Cucujiformia
- Family: Mordellidae
- Subfamily: Mordellinae
- Tribe: Mordellistenini
- Genus: Ermischiella; Franciscolo, 1950

Genus of beetles

Ermischiella is a genus of tumbling flower beetles in the family Mordellidae, found in Afrotropical, Oriental, and Palaearctic Regions.

== Species ==
The following species are members of the genus Ermischiella.

- Ermischiella bejceki Horák, Farkac & Nakládal, 2012 (Socotra)
- Ermischiella castanea (Boheman, 1858)
- Ermischiella chichijimana Nomura, 1975
- Ermischiella fukiensis (Ermisch, 1951)
- Ermischiella hahajimana Nomura, 1975
- Ermischiella nigriceps Nomura, 1975
- Ermischiella papuana Franciscolo, 1950
