= Lallemandana tubuaii =

Scientific classification
- Kingdom: Animalia
- Phylum: Arthropoda
- Class: Insecta
- Order: Hemiptera
- Suborder: Auchenorrhyncha
- Family: Aphrophoridae
- Genus: Lallemandana
- Species: L. tubuaii

Binomial name
- Lallemandana tubuaii Hamilton, 1980

Species of spittlebug

Lallemandana tubuaii is a species of spittlebug.
