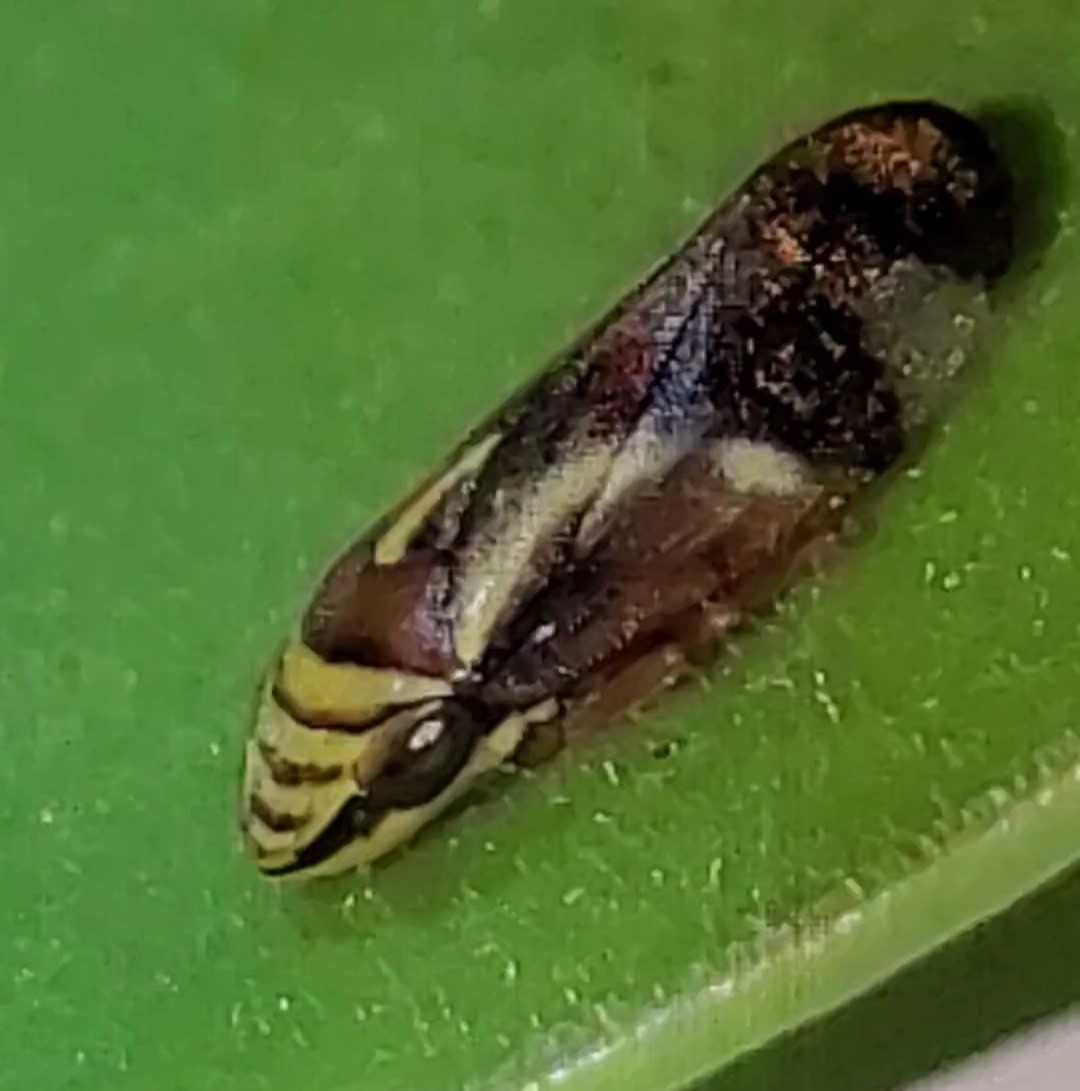

Scientific classification
- Kingdom: Animalia
- Phylum: Arthropoda
- Clade: Pancrustacea
- Class: Insecta
- Order: Hemiptera
- Suborder: Auchenorrhyncha
- Family: Aphrophoridae
- Genus: Lallemandana
- Species: L. phalerata

Binomial name
- Lallemandana phalerata (Stål, 1854)

Synonyms
- Clovia phalerata (Stål, 1854); Lallemandia phalerata (Stål, 1854); Perinoia phalerata (Stål, 1854); Ptyelus phaleratus (Stål, 1854)

= Lallemandana phalerata =

Species of insect

Lallemandana phalerata is a species of spittlebug belonging to the family Cercopidae.

== Distribution ==
This species has been collected from Guam, Northern Mariana Islands, and the Federated States of Micronesia. On Guam, it has been collected on Polygonum, Jussiaea, Cycas micronesica, Scaevola taccada, Piper guahamense, Ficus, Psychotria, etc.

== Gallery ==
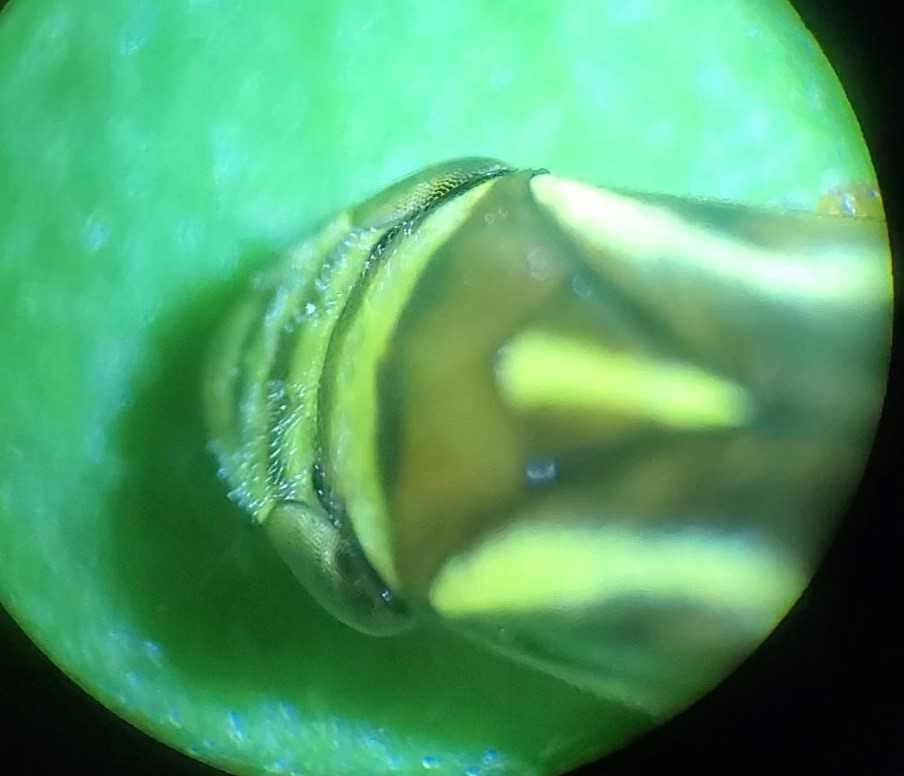
Head under magnification. Dededo, Guam

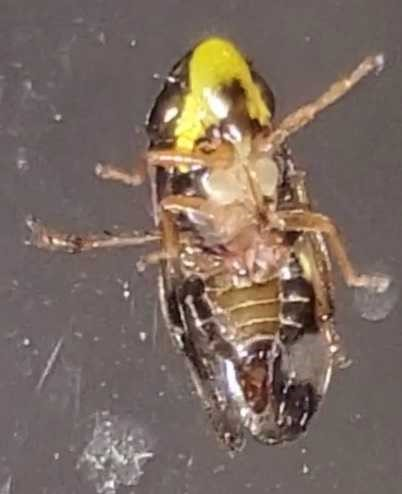
Ventral view

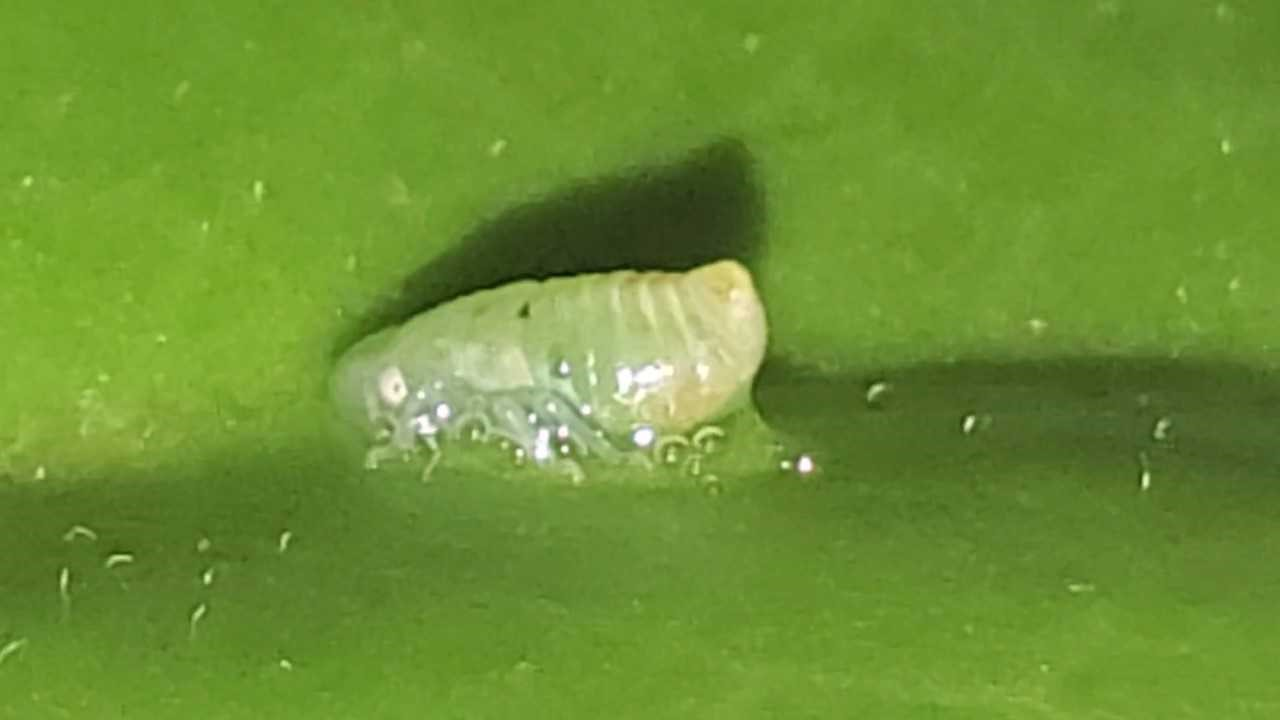
Nymph, lateral view

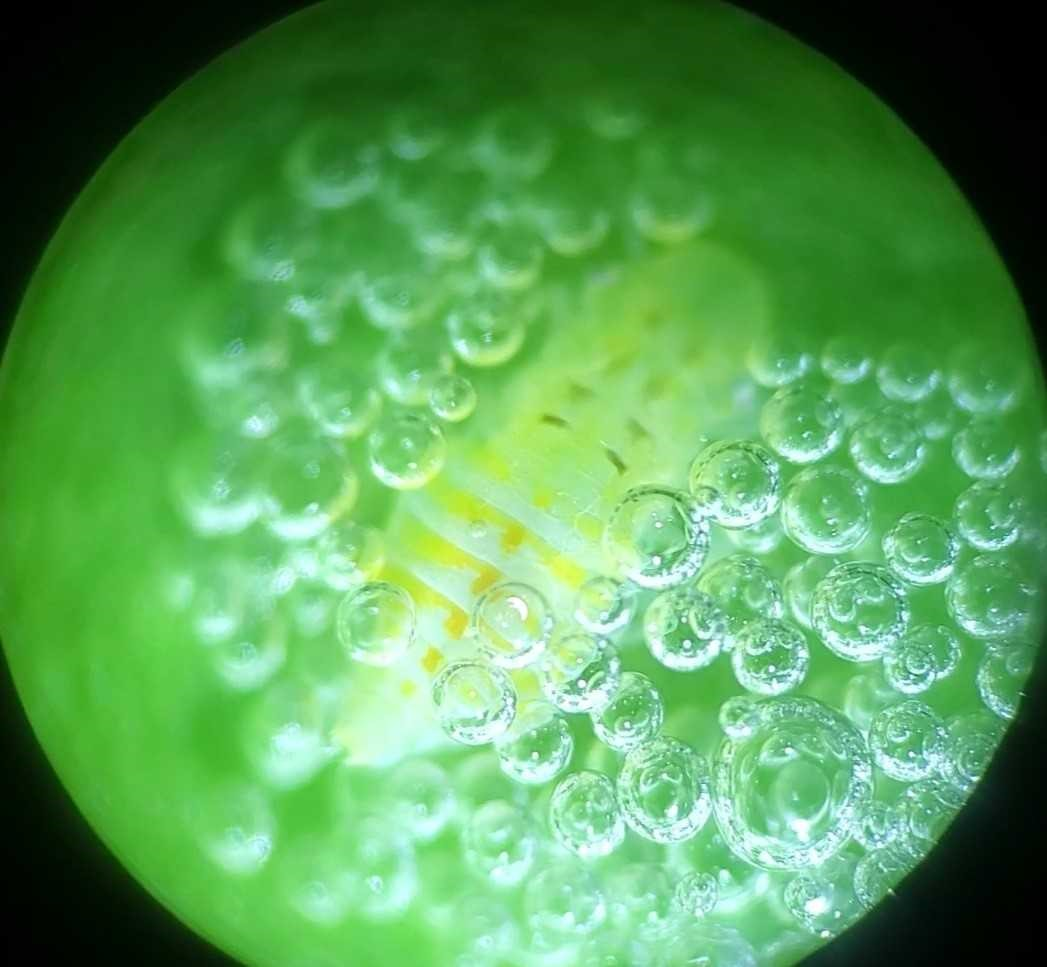
Nymph, dorsal view, in "spittle"

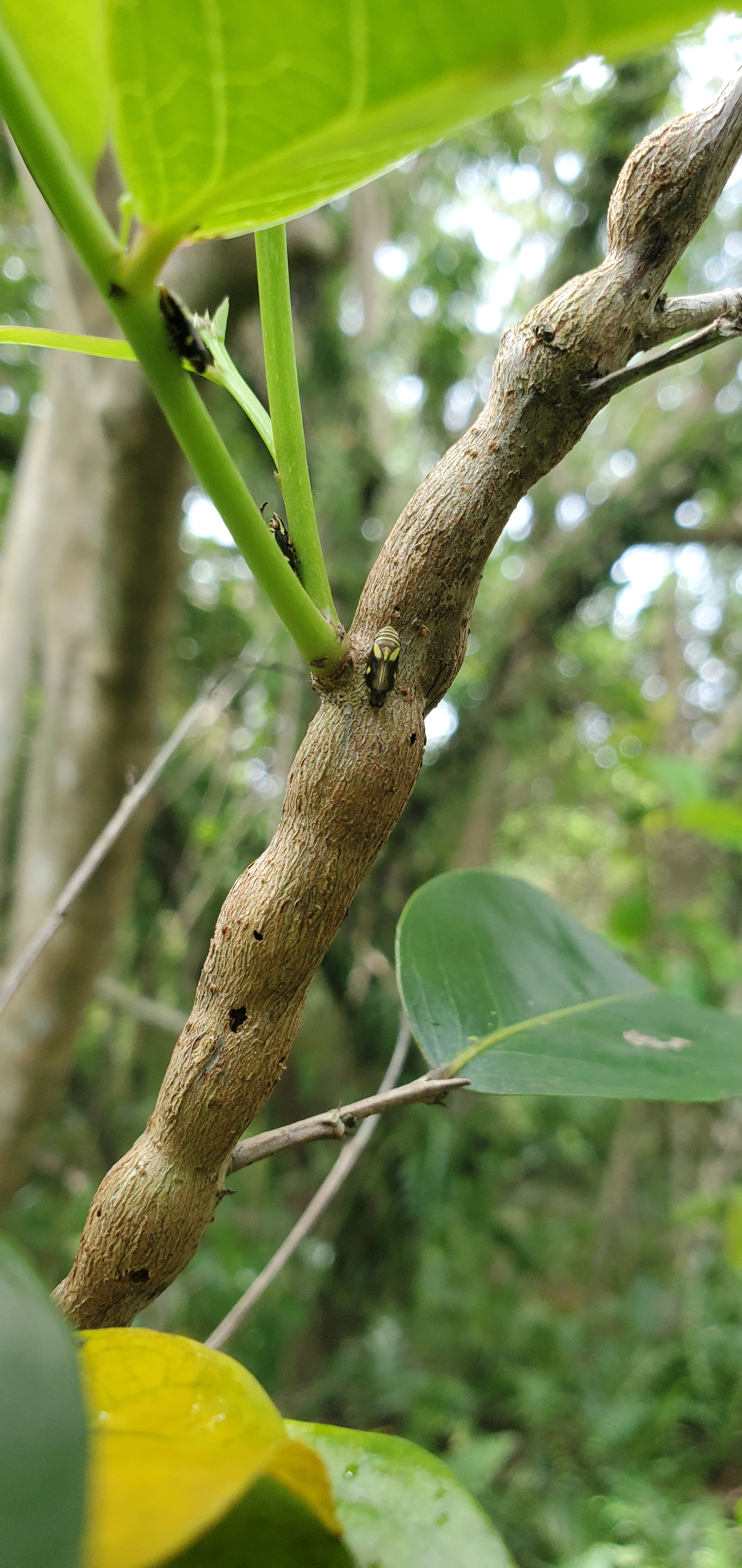
Lallemandana phalerata on Phyllanthus mariannensis stem. Dededo, Guam

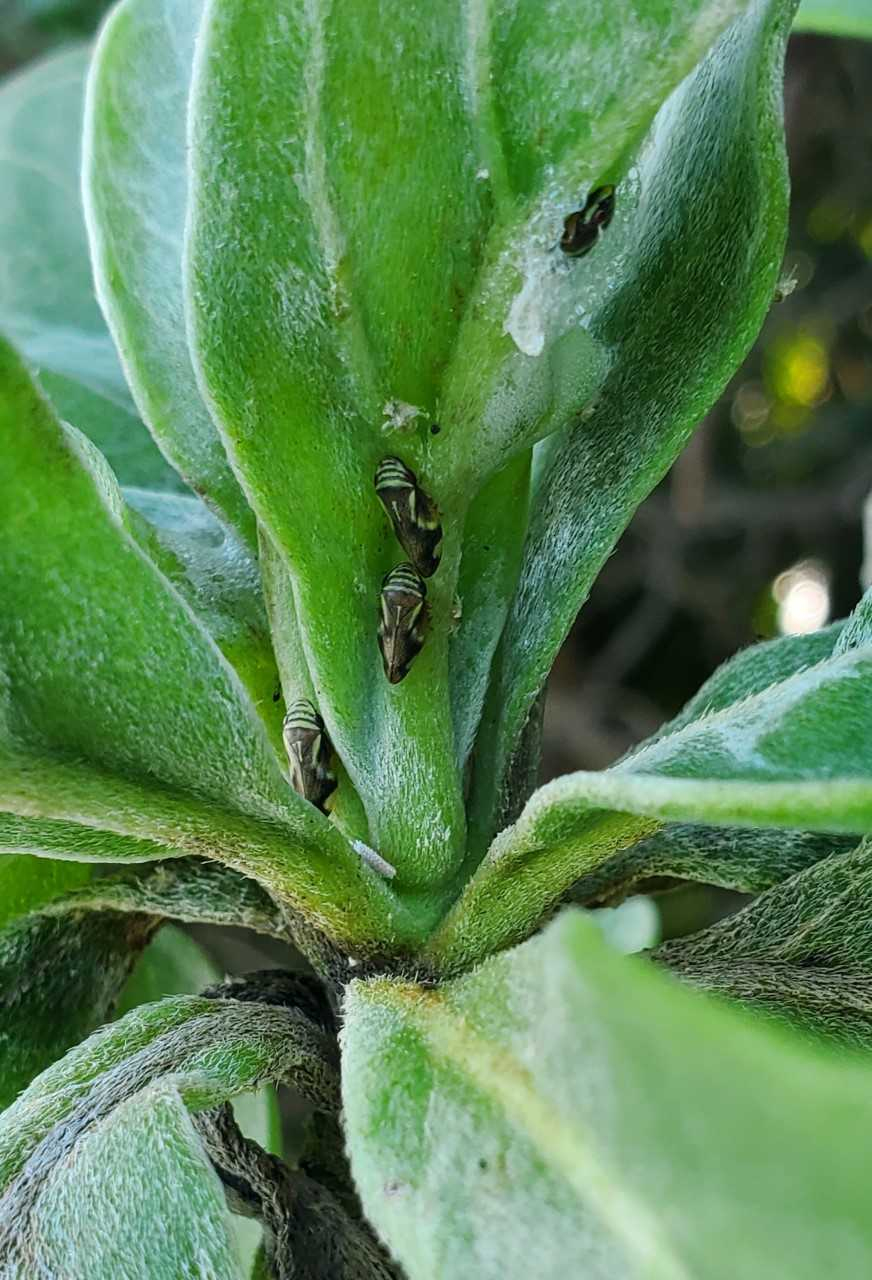
Spittle nest on leaves of Heliotropium arboreum. Dededo, Guam
