= Dellamora palposa =

Scientific classification
- Domain: Eukaryota
- Kingdom: Animalia
- Phylum: Arthropoda
- Class: Insecta
- Order: Coleoptera
- Suborder: Polyphaga
- Infraorder: Cucujiformia
- Family: Mordellidae
- Genus: Dellamora
- Species: D. palposa

Binomial name
- Dellamora palposa Normand, 1916

Synonyms
- Mordellistena castiliana Deville], 1941

Species of beetle

Dellamora palposa is a species of beetle in the genus Dellamora. It was discovered in 1916.
