= Ermischiella nigriceps =

Scientific classification
- Domain: Eukaryota
- Kingdom: Animalia
- Phylum: Arthropoda
- Class: Insecta
- Order: Coleoptera
- Suborder: Polyphaga
- Infraorder: Cucujiformia
- Family: Mordellidae
- Genus: Ermischiella
- Species: E. nigriceps

Binomial name
- Ermischiella nigriceps Nomura, 1975

Species of beetle

Ermischiella nigriceps is a species of beetle in the genus Ermischiella. It was described in 1975.
