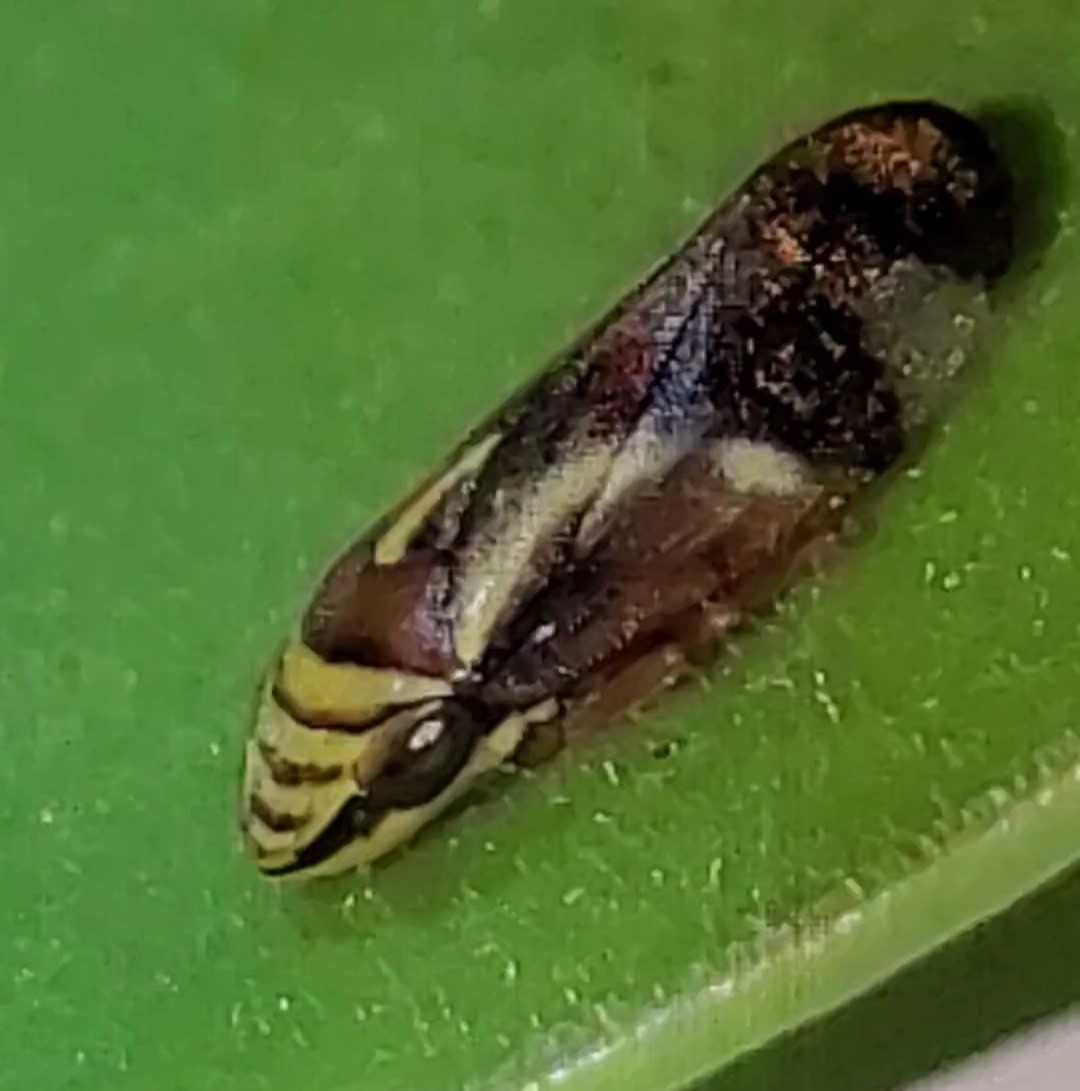
- Lallemandana phalerata

Scientific classification
- Domain: Eukaryota
- Kingdom: Animalia
- Phylum: Arthropoda
- Class: Insecta
- Order: Hemiptera
- Suborder: Auchenorrhyncha
- Family: Aphrophoridae
- Subfamily: Aphrophorinae
- Tribe: Cloviini
- Genus: Lallemandana; China & Myers, 1934

= Lallemandana =

Genus of spittlebugs

Lallemandana is a genus of spittlebug.

== Species ==
- Lallemandana armstrongi
- Lallemandana australis
- Lallemandana biformis
- Lallemandana brunnea
- Lallemandana bryani
- Lallemandana buxtoni
- Lallemandana carolinensis
- Lallemandana cheesmani
- Lallemandana clavata
- Lallemandana conjuncta
- Lallemandana crockeri
- Lallemandana eugeniae
- Lallemandana fenestrata
- Lallemandana flavipes
- Lallemandana gressitti
- Lallemandana guamensis
- Lallemandana huahinensis
- Lallemandana insulata
- Lallemandana juddi
- Lallemandana mareana
- Lallemandana mumfordi
- Lallemandana navigans
- Lallemandana pararapana
- Lallemandana phalerata
- Lallemandana picturata
- Lallemandana pseudorapana
- Lallemandana rarotongae
- Lallemandana reducta
- Lallemandana solomonensis
- Lallemandana spinifera
- Lallemandana swezeyi
- Lallemandana trukensis
- Lallemandana tubuaii
- Lallemandana tylata
- Lallemandana zimmermani
