= Ermischiella fukiensis =

Scientific classification
- Domain: Eukaryota
- Kingdom: Animalia
- Phylum: Arthropoda
- Class: Insecta
- Order: Coleoptera
- Suborder: Polyphaga
- Infraorder: Cucujiformia
- Family: Mordellidae
- Genus: Ermischiella
- Species: E. fukiensis

Binomial name
- Ermischiella fukiensis Ermisch, 1952

Species of beetle

Ermischiella fukiensis is a species of beetle in the genus Ermischiella. It was described in 1952.
