= Dellamora =

Scientific classification
- Domain: Eukaryota
- Kingdom: Animalia
- Phylum: Arthropoda
- Class: Insecta
- Order: Coleoptera
- Suborder: Polyphaga
- Infraorder: Cucujiformia
- Family: Mordellidae
- Subfamily: Mordellinae
- Tribe: Mordellistenini
- Genus: Dellamora; Normand, 1916

Type species
- Dellamora palposa Normand, 1916

Genus of beetles

Dellamora is a genus of tumbling flower beetles in the family Mordellidae. There are at least two described species in Dellamora.

== Species ==
These two species belong to the genus Dellamora:

- Dellamora castanea (Boheman, 1858) (New Caledonia)
- Dellamora palposa Normand, 1916 (Palearctic, Tunisia)
