= Linnean Society (disambiguation) =

Linnean Society usually refers to the Linnean Society of London. Organisations with similar names include:

Australia

- Linnean Society of New South Wales

Canada

- Société linnéenne du Québec

France

- La Société Linnéenne de la Seine maritime
- Société linnéenne de Lyon
- Société linnéenne de Provence
- Société Linnéenne de Bordeaux
- Société Linnéenne de Normandie

Sweden

- Swedish Linnaeus Society

United States

- Linnean Society of Lake Superior
- Linnaean Society of New York
- Philadelphia Linnean Society of which Zaccheus Collins was a member
