= Dellamora castanea =

Scientific classification
- Kingdom: Animalia
- Phylum: Arthropoda
- Class: Insecta
- Order: Coleoptera
- Suborder: Polyphaga
- Infraorder: Cucujiformia
- Family: Mordellidae
- Subfamily: Mordellinae
- Tribe: Mordellistenini
- Genus: Dellamora
- Species: D. castanea

Binomial name
- Dellamora castanea (Boheman, 1858)

Synonyms
- Mordella castanea Boheman, 1858; Mordella dodoneae Montrouzier, 1860; Mordellistena castanea (Boheman); Mordellistena dodoneae (Montrouzier, 1860); Ermischiella castanea (Boheman, 1858)

Species of beetles

Dellamora castanea is a species of tumbling flower beetle in the family Mordellidae. It has been found on South Pacific Islands.
