= List of archaeological sites in Colombia =

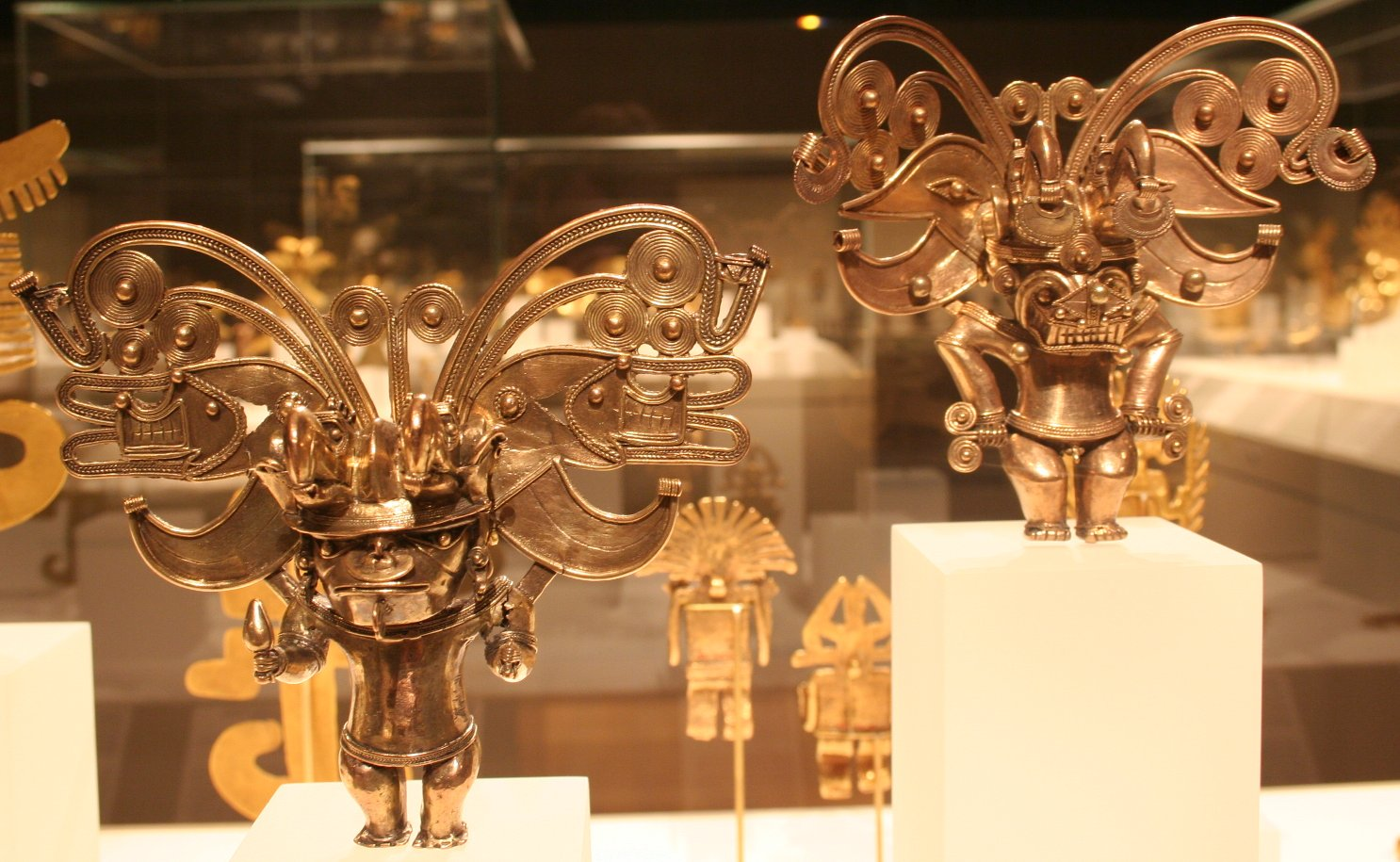
Photograph of Tairona gold pendants in the Metropolitan Museum of Art, New York City. Repatriation of archaeological treasures is a very important issue for the Colombian government

Archaeological sites in Colombia are numerous and diverse, including findings and archaeological excavations that have taken place in the area now covered by the Republic of Colombia. The archaeological finds and features cover all periods since the Paleolithic, representing different aspects of the various cultures of ancient precolumbian civilizations, such as the Muisca, Quimbaya and Tairona among many others. Preservation and investigation of these sites are controlled mainly by the Ministry of Culture, the National Institute of Anthropology and History, and the Bank of the Republic. The lack of funding to protect sites and enforce existing laws, results in large scale looting and illegal trading of artifacts.

== List of archaeological sites ==
Age	Period	Site	Image
10,400 BC	Late Pleistocene-preceramic	El Abra	
9850 BC	Late Pleistocene-preceramic	Tibitó	
9000 BC - 1537	Late Pleistocene-preceramic-Herrera-Muisca	Tequendama	
6500-1500 BC	Andean preceramic	Checua	
6000-5000 BC	Neolithic	Monsú and Puerto Hormiga	
3000-700 BC	Andean preceramic-Herrera	Aguazuque	
2500-1500 BC	Andean preceramic	El Infiernito	
1600-500 BC	Delayed Cacical	El Morro del Tulcán	
600 BC - 300	Formative Sinú Malagana-Sonsoid	Malagana	
800 BC	Early Tairona	Ciudad Perdida	
200 BC	Classic San Agustin	San Agustín	
200 BC - 600	Classic Tierradentro	Tierradentro	

== See also ==
- List of pre-Columbian cultures
