= Piedras del Tunjo Archaeological Park =

Archaeological park

Piedras del Tunjo
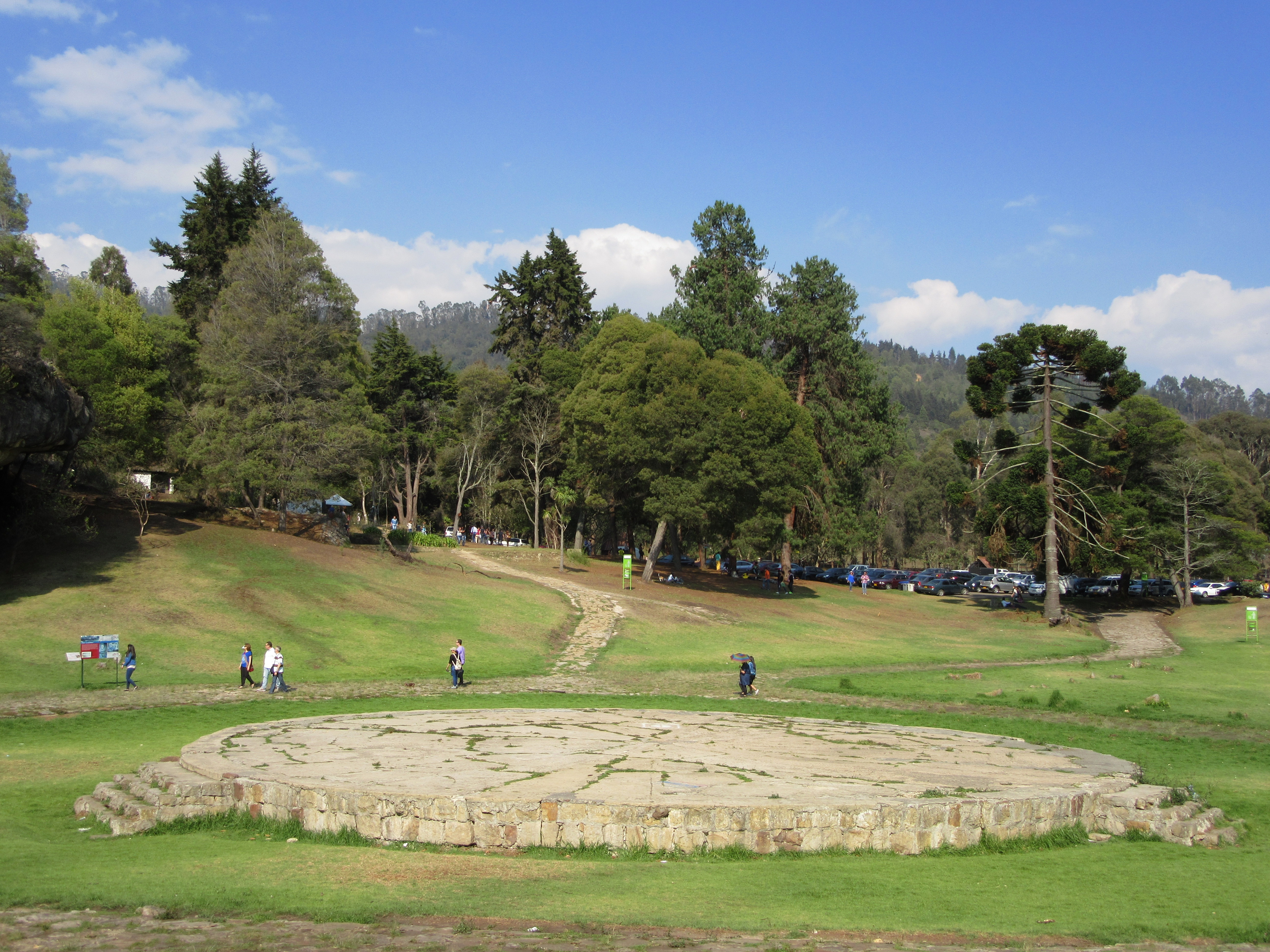
- Centre of the Piedras del Tunjo Archaeological Park

- Location within Colombia
- 4°48′59.59″N 74°20′45.59″W
- Type: Rock art
- Periods: Herrera Period-Late Muisca
- Cultures: Muisca
- Satellite of: Bacatá
- Location: Facatativá, Cundinamarca
- Region: Altiplano Cundiboyacense; Colombia
- Part of: Pre-Muisca sites

History
- Abandoned: Spanish conquest

Site notes
- Elevation: 2,611 m (8,566 ft)
- Archaeologists: Diego Martínez Celis; Álvaro Botiva Contreras; Guillermo Muñoz Castiblanco
- Condition: Threatened
- Public access: Yes

Piedras del Tunjo (Spanish for "Tunjo Rocks") is an important archaeological park established on a natural rock shelter 40 kilometres (25 mi) west of Bogotá in the municipality of Facatativá.

== Description ==
Piedras del Tunjo and other rock shelters on and around the Bogotá savanna

In the Late Pleistocene, the site used to be the shore of a large lake flooding the Bogotá savanna; Lake Humboldt .8 It was used by the Muisca rulers as a refuge during the time of the Spanish conquest. The site is one of the possible places where the soldiers of Gonzalo Jiménez de Quesada killed the ruling zipa Tisquesusa in April 1537.

The rocks are covered with pictographs made by Muisca artists on rocks of the Guadalupe Group. Their age has not been confirmed. The area of the park used to be an hacienda, property of a wealthy family since colonial times. It was nationalized in 1946 to establish the park.

=== Destruction of the ancient pictographs ===
Decades of government negligence and lack of policies for the protection of archaeological heritage have resulted in the destruction of most of the ancient paintings.

== Gallery ==
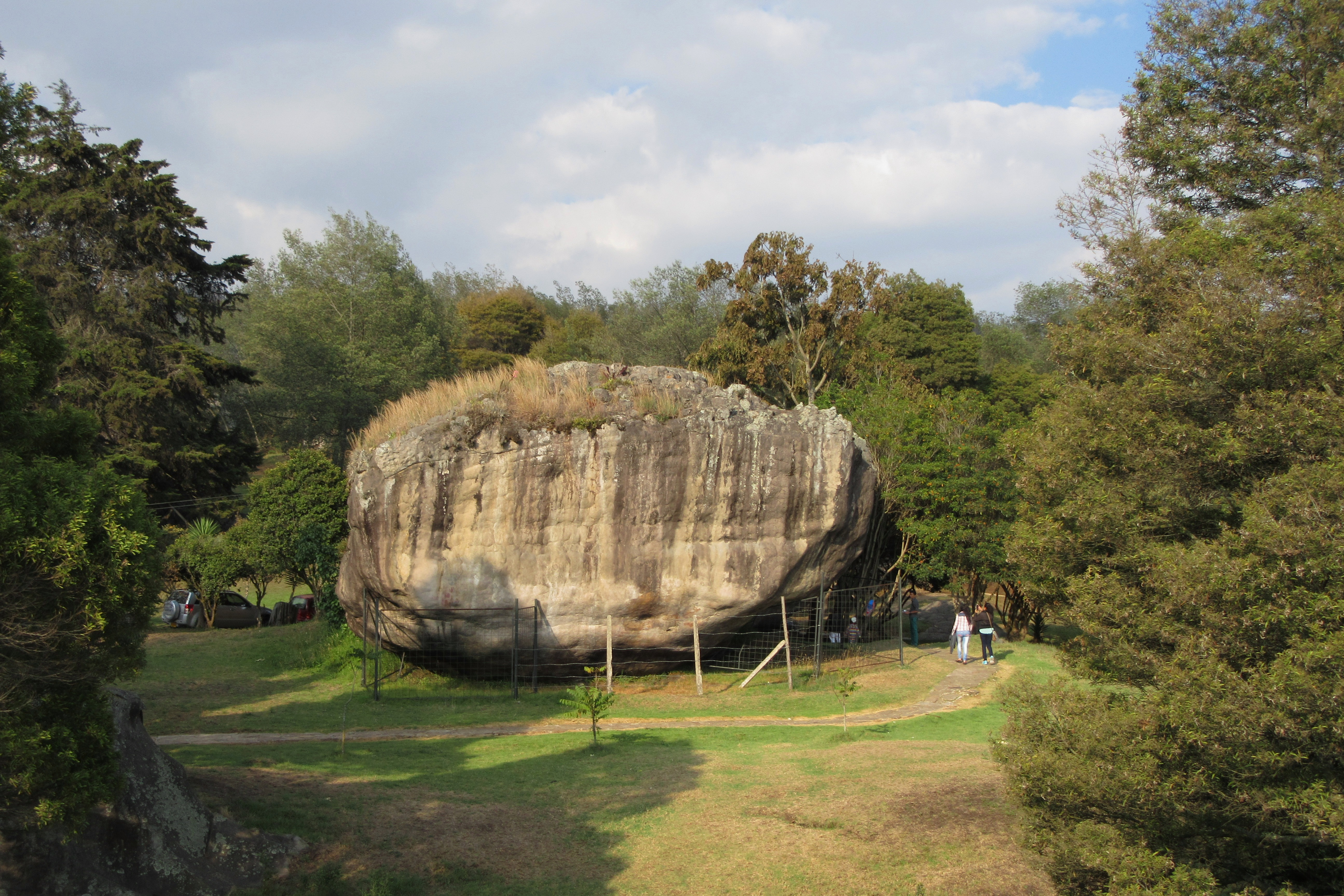
Rock face with petroglyphs

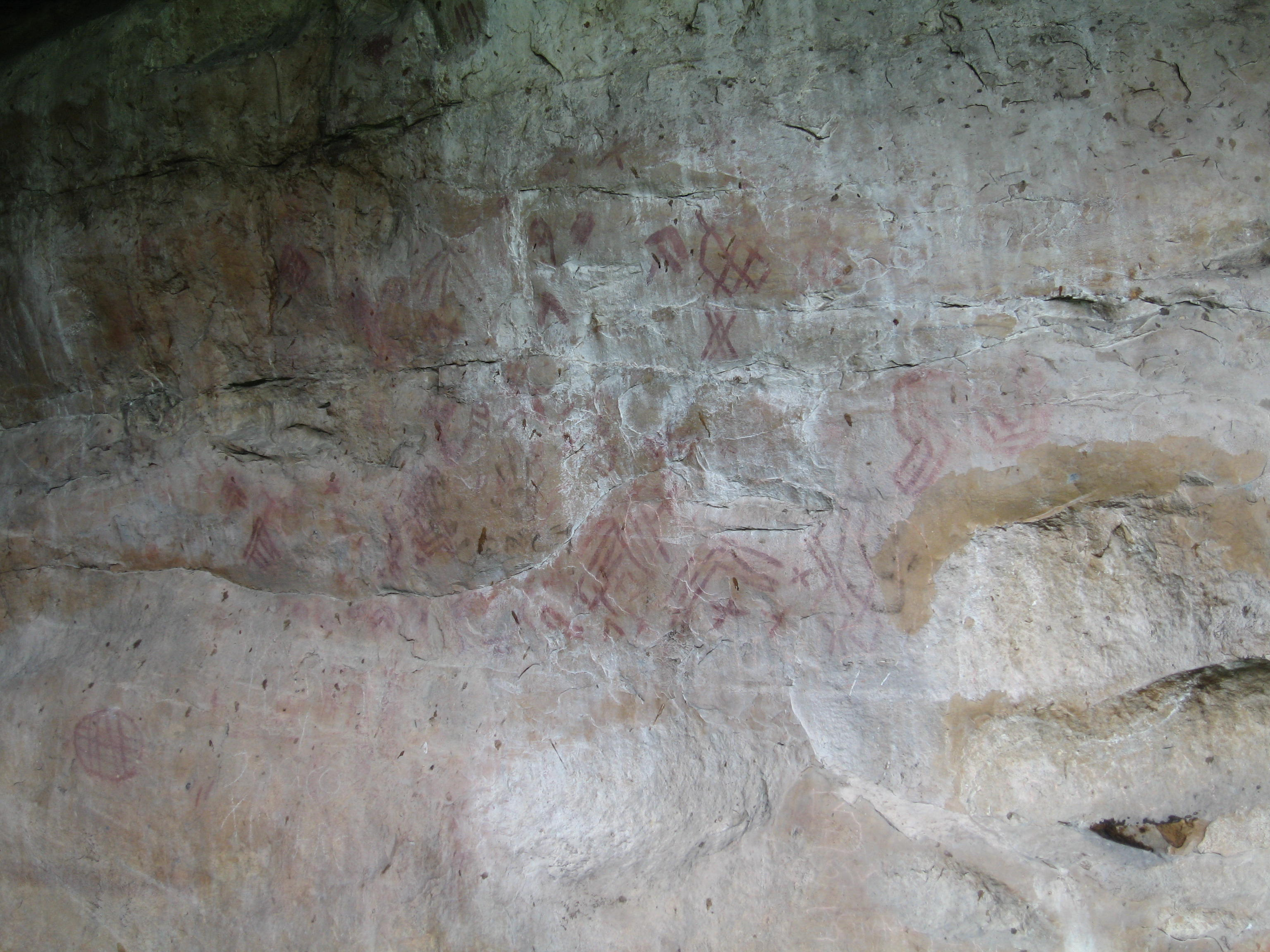
Petroglyph on one of the rocks

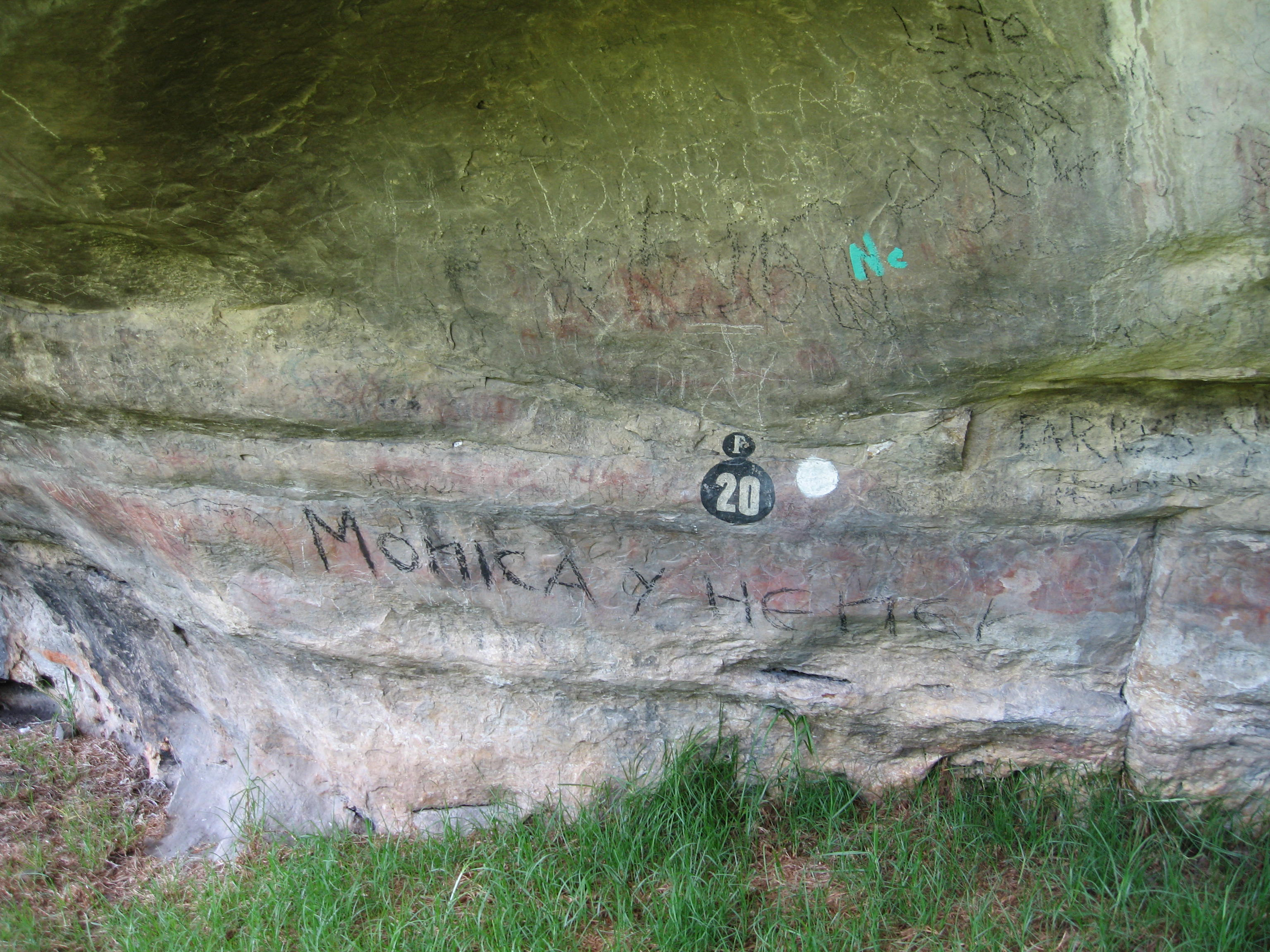
Vandalised petroglyph

== See also ==
- Aguazuque, Checua, Tequendama, Tibitó, Sun Temple
- El Abra, Cojines del Zaque
