= List of Muisca and pre-Muisca sites =

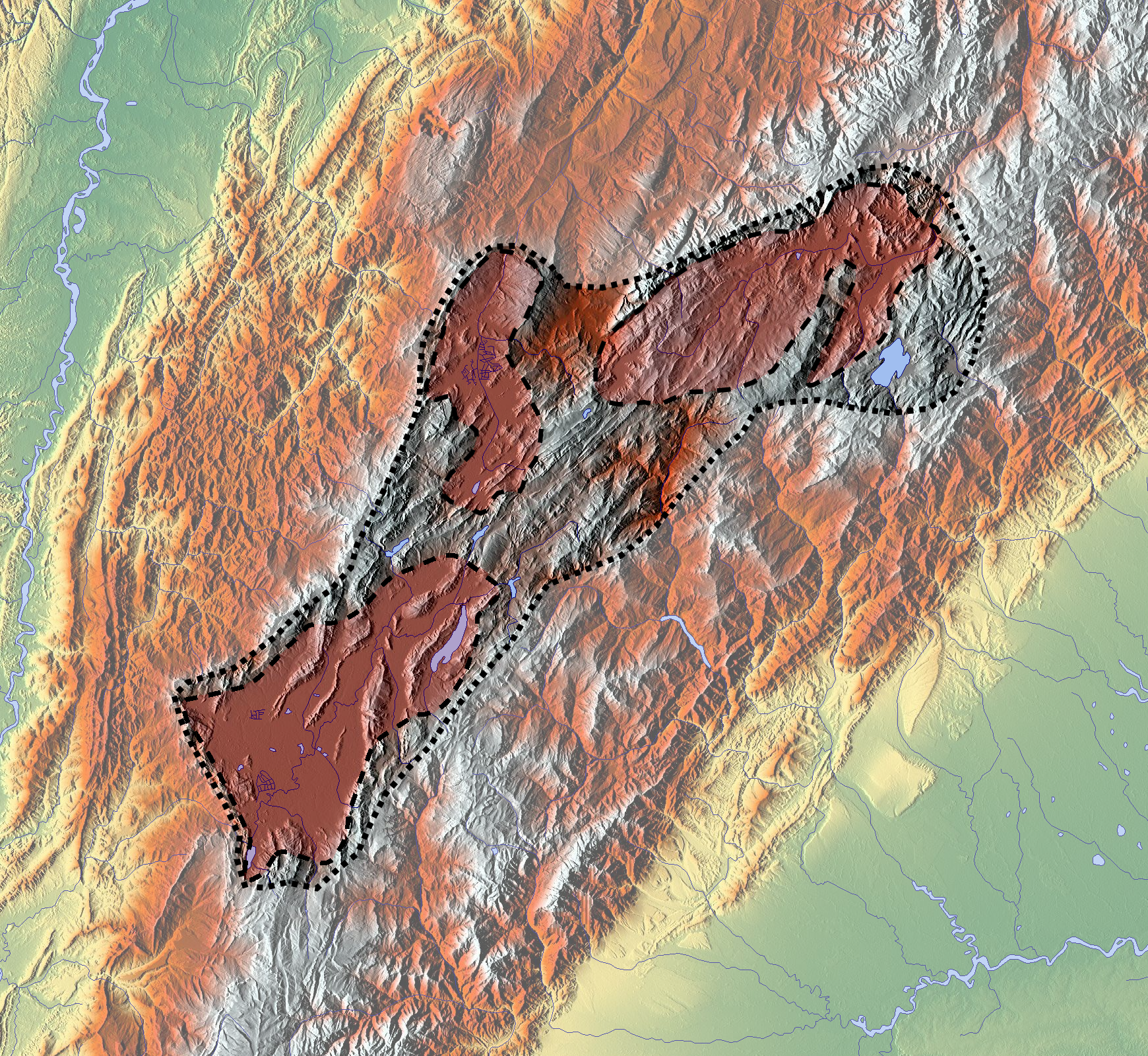
Important pre-Muisca sites on the Altiplano Cundiboyacense
- Rock shelters
- Open area settlements
- Constructed sites
- A - El Abra
- Ti - Tibitó
- Su - Sueva
- Te - Tequendama
- C - Checua/Nemocón
- Ag - Aguazuque
- Sa - Sáchica
- H - Lake Herrera
- I - El Infiernito
- ST - Sun Temple
- CZ - Cojines del Zaque

This is a list of Muisca and pre-Muisca archaeological sites; sites on the Altiplano Cundiboyacense, where archaeological evidence has been discovered of the Muisca and their ancestors of the Herrera, preceramic and prehistorical periods.

Over the course of the centuries and mainly in the 21st century, many sites with evidences of Muisca and pre-Muisca presence have been found and reported.

The possibly oldest evidence of human settlement in the Eastern Ranges of the Colombian Andes has been discovered just west of the former Muisca territories, at Pubenza in Tocaima, Cundinamarca. Eight stone tools have been found with bone remains, consisting of among others Haplomastodon and turtles, which have been dated at 16,400 ± 420 years BP. Due to the location at an inundated platform, it is unclear if the bones and thus age were in situ.

== Background ==
Stage	Start age	End age
Prehistory		10,000
Preceramic	10,000	2800
Herrera	2800	1200
Muisca	1200	479
Colonial period	479	206
Colombia	206	

The Altiplano Cundiboyacense, with its valleys of Sogamoso-Duitama, Tunja and Ubaté-Chiquinquirá and the southeastern flatlands of the Bogotá savanna, as well as the Tenza Valley to the east, was inhabited for 12,000 years by indigenous peoples. At the arrival of the Spanish conquistadors, the area of approximately 25,000 square kilometres (9,700 sq mi) was populated by the Muisca, organised in a loose confederation; the Muisca Confederation.

While various classifications of the archaeological history of the Andean high plateau exist, the most commonly accepted sequence, in years BP, is shown to the right.

== Timeline of inhabitation ==
Timeline of inhabitation of the Altiplano Cundiboyacense, Colombia
Altiplano Muisca Confederation

== List of Muisca and pre-Muisca sites ==
Site name	Image	Municipality	Department	Start	End	Oldest date years BP	Finds	Notes	Map
El Abra		Zipaquirá	Cundinamarca	Prehistory	Herrera	12,560	Rock art Stone tools		
Tibitó		Tocancipá	Cundinamarca	Prehistory	Herrera	11,850	Stone & bone tools Carbon		
Sueva		Junín	Cundinamarca	Prehistory	Herrera	11,180	Rock shelter		
Tequendama		Soacha	Cundinamarca	Prehistory	Spanish conquest	11,120	Stone tools Domestication of guinea pigs		
Piedras del Tunjo		Facatativá	Cundinamarca	Prehistory or Preceramic	Muisca	unknown	Rock art Stone tools		
Galindo		Bojacá	Cundinamarca	Preceramic	Herrera	8800	Open area settlement		
Checua		Nemocón	Cundinamarca	Preceramic	Herrera	8500	Stone tools		
		Nemocón	Cundinamarca	Preceramic		7630	Rock shelter Main salt producing town		
Piedra del Indio; Chía I-VIII; Moon Temple		Chía	Cundinamarca	Preceramic		5140	Rock art Burial site Religious place		
		Zipaquirá	Cundinamarca	Preceramic		5140	Main salt producing town		
Aguazuque		Soacha	Cundinamarca	Preceramic	Herrera	4065	Stone tools Burial grounds Human remains Guinea pigs, deer		
Lake Herrera		Madrid; Mosquera; Bojacá	Cundinamarca	Preceramic	Herrera	3410	Stone tools Ceramics		
SO10-IX		Sativanorte	Boyacá	Preceramic	Preceramic	3386	Muisca mummy		
		Zipacón	Cundinamarca	Preceramic		3270	Rock shelter Rock art Oldest agriculture		
El Infiernito		Villa de Leyva	Boyacá	Preceramic	Muisca	2975	Archaeoastronomical site Muisca mummy		
		Pasca	Cundinamarca	Herrera		1400	Muisca raft		
		Buenavista	Boyacá	Herrera		1396	Nose piece and pectoral dated at 620 & 990 AD		
		Suesca	Cundinamarca	Muisca			150 Muisca mummies Petrographs; Ceramics		
		Gachantivá	Boyacá	Muisca			Muisca mummy Muisca copper mines		
		Gachancipá	Cundinamarca	Muisca			Muisca mummy		
		Ubaté	Cundinamarca	Muisca			Muisca mummy		
		Tenjo	Cundinamarca	Muisca			Petrographs		
		Tibacuy	Cundinamarca	Muisca			Petrographs		
		Berbeo	Boyacá	Muisca			Petroglyphs		
		Sáchica	Boyacá	Muisca			Petrographs		
Ocetá Páramo		Monguí	Boyacá		Muisca		Petroglyphs; Birth sites Myths		
Payará		Tausa	Cundinamarca						
		Choachí	Cundinamarca	Muisca			Choachí Stone		
		La Calera	Cundinamarca	Muisca			Petrographs		
		Chipaque	Cundinamarca	Muisca			Petrographs		
		Cogua	Cundinamarca	Muisca			Petrographs		
		Cota	Cundinamarca	Muisca			Petrographs		
		Cucunubá	Cundinamarca	Muisca			Petrographs		
		Guachetá	Cundinamarca	Muisca			Petrographs		
		Guasca	Cundinamarca	Muisca			Petrographs		
		Guatavita	Cundinamarca	Muisca			Petrographs		
		Machetá	Cundinamarca	Muisca			Petrographs		
		Madrid	Cundinamarca	Muisca			Petrographs		
		Mosquera	Cundinamarca	Muisca			Petrographs		
		San Antonio del Tequendama	Cundinamarca	Muisca			Petrographs		
		San Francisco	Cundinamarca	Muisca			Petrographs		
		Sibaté	Cundinamarca	Muisca			Petrographs		
		Subachoque	Cundinamarca	Muisca			Petrographs		
		Tena	Cundinamarca	Muisca			Petrographs		
		Tibiritá	Cundinamarca	Muisca			Petrographs		
		Tocancipá	Cundinamarca	Muisca			Petrographs		
		Une	Cundinamarca	Muisca			Petrographs		
		Bosa	Cundinamarca	Muisca			Petrographs		
		Usme	Cundinamarca	Muisca			Muisca mummy Petrographs		
		Boavita	Boyacá	Muisca			Muisca mummy		
		Tasco	Boyacá	Muisca			Muisca mummy		
		Tópaga	Boyacá	Muisca			Muisca mummy		
		Gámeza	Boyacá	Muisca			Muisca mummy Petrographs		
		Belén	Boyacá	Muisca			Petrographs		
		Iza	Boyacá	Muisca			Petrographs		
		Mongua	Boyacá	Muisca			Petrographs		
		Motavita	Boyacá	Muisca			Petrographs		
		Ramiriquí	Boyacá	Muisca			Petrographs		
		Saboyá	Boyacá	Muisca			Petrographs		
		Tibaná	Boyacá	Muisca			Petrographs		
		Sutamarchán	Boyacá	Muisca			Muisca ceramics production		
		Tinjacá	Boyacá	Muisca			Muisca ceramics production		
Sun Temple		Sogamoso	Boyacá	Muisca	September 1537		Most important Muisca temple		
Cojines del Zaque		Tunja	Boyacá	Muisca	Early colonial		Religious place		
Hunzahúa Well		Tunja	Boyacá	Muisca	Early colonial		Mythological place		
Goranchacha Temple		Tunja	Boyacá	Muisca	Early colonial		Temple of Goranchacha		

== See also ==
- List of Muisca research institutes, archaeological sites in Colombia
- Muisca art
- Muisca Confederation, economy
- Lake Guatavita, Tota, Iguaque, Suesca, Fúquene, Siecha Lakes, Tequendama Falls
- List of Maya sites

== Bibliography ==
- Aceituno Bocanegra, Francisco Javier; Rojas Mora, Sneider (2012), "Del Paleoindio al Formativo: 10.000 años para la historia de la tecnología lítica en Colombia - From the Paleoindian to the Formative Stage: 10,000 years for the history of lithic technology in Colombia" (PDF), Boletín de Antropología (in Spanish), 28 (43), University of Antioquia: 124–156, ISSN 0120-2510
- Cooke, Richard (1998), "Human settlement of Central America and northernmost South America (14,000-8000 BP)", Quaternary International, 49/50 (1), Pergamon: 177–190, Bibcode:1998QuInt..49..177C, doi:10.1016/S1040-6182(97)00062-1, ISSN 1040-6182
- Correal Urrego, Gonzalo (1990), Aguazuque: Evidence of hunter-gatherers and growers on the high plains of the Eastern Ranges (PDF) (in Spanish), Bogotá, Colombia: Banco de la República: Fundación de Investigaciones Arqueológicas Nacionales, pp. 1–316
- Groot de Mahecha, Ana María (2014) [2008], Sal y poder en el altiplano de Bogotá, 1537-1640 (in Spanish), Universidad Nacional de Colombia, pp. 1–174, ISBN 978-958-719-046-5
- Groot de Mahecha, Ana María (1992), Checua: Una secuencia cultural entre 8500 y 3000 años antes del presente - Checua: a cultural sequence between 8500 and 3000 years before present, Banco de la República, pp. 1–95
- Izquierdo Peña, Manuel Arturo (2009), The Muisca Calendar: An approximation to the timekeeping system of the ancient native people of the northeastern Andes of Colombia (M.A.), Université de Montréal, pp. 1–170, arXiv:0812.0574
- López Estupiñán, Laura (2011), Topando piedras, sumercé. Narraciones en torno a las piedras de Iza y Gámeza, Boyacá, Colombia - Bumping into stones, mister. Tales around the stones of Iza and Gámeza, Boyacá, Colombia (M.A.) (M.A.) (in Spanish), vol. 2, Rupestreweb
- Martínez Celis, Diego; Botiva Contreras, Álvaro (2004a), Manual de arte rupestre de Cundinamarca - Manual of rock art of Cundinamarca (in Spanish), ICANH, pp. 1–60, ISBN 958-8181-07-0
- Martínez Celis, Diego; Botiva Contreras, Álvaro (2004b), Introducción al arte rupestre (in Spanish), ICANH, pp. 1–28
- Martínez Martín, Abel Fernando; Martínez Santamaría, Luz (2012), "Sobre la momificación y los cuerpos momificados de los muiscas - On mummification and the mummified bodies of the Muisca", Revista Salud Historia Sanidad, 7 (in Spanish), 1: 61–80, ISSN 1909-2407
- Martínez Martín, Abel Fernando; Meléndez, Fernardo Francisco; Manrique, Fred Gustavo (2010), "Bio-anthropology and paleopathology of the SO10-IX Muisca mummy from Sátivanorte, Boyacá, Colombia", Colombia Médica, 41 (2), Universidad del Valle: 112–120, ISSN 1657-9534
- Muñoz Castiblanco, Guillermo (2013), Catalogación, registro sistemático y diagnóstico de las pinturas rupestres del Parque Arqueológico de Facatativá (in Spanish), GIPRI, pp. 1–89
- Muñoz Castiblanco, Guillermo (2006), Pinturas rupestres en el Altiplano Cundiboyacense, Colombia - concentración y diversidad en la Sabana de Bogotá: Municipio de Suacha-Sibaté Cundinamarca - Rock paintings on the Altiplano Cundiboyacense, Colombia - concentration and diversity on the Bogotá savanna: municipality of Soacha-Sibaté, Cundinamarca (in Spanish), pp. 1–22
- Ocampo López, Javier (2007), Grandes culturas indígenas de América - Great indigenous cultures of the Americas (in Spanish), Bogotá, Colombia: Plaza & Janes Editores Colombia S.A., pp. 1–238, ISBN 978-958-14-0368-4
- Silva Celis, Eliécer (1981), Investigaciones en Villa de Leiva (in Spanish), pp. 1–18
- Valverde, Alejandra (2007), "Prácticas funerarias desde la arqueología: El caso de las momias de la Sierra Nevada del Cocuy - Funerary practices in archaeology: The study of Sierra Nevada del Cocuy's mummies, Colombia", Antípoda, 5, Universidad de los Andes: 275–291, doi:10.7440/antipoda5.2007.12, ISSN 1900-5407
- Cronologías de la región Muisca (PDF), University of Pittsburgh, pp. 1–5
