= El Abra =

Archeological site

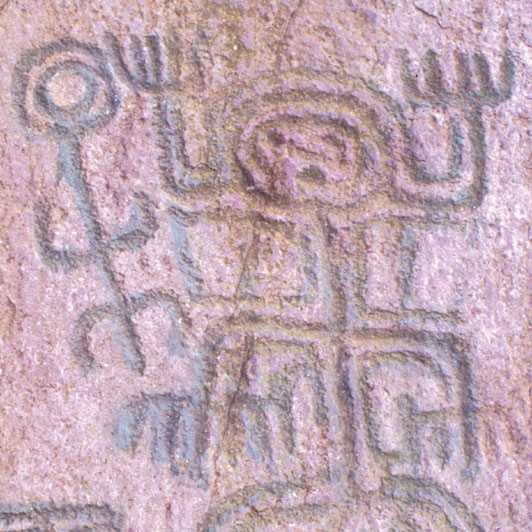
- Petroglyph of El Abra

- Location within Colombia
- 5°01′02.49″N 73°57′04.33″W
- Type: Rock shelter, petroglyphs
- Periods: Prehistory-Herrera
- Cultures: Preceramic hunter-gatherers
- Location: Zipaquirá, Tocancipá, Cundinamarca
- Region: Bogotá savanna Altiplano Cundiboyacense; Colombia
- Part of: Pre-Muisca sites

History
- Abandoned: Herrera Period

Site notes
- Material: Sandstone
- Elevation: 2,570 m (8,430 ft)
- Excavation dates: 1967
- Archaeologists: Correal, Hammen
- Owner: Hacienda El Abra, Cesar Orjuela
- Public access: Partly

Designations
- Designation: Climbing area

El Abra is the name given to an extensive archeological site, located in the valley of the same name. El Abra is situated in the east of the municipality Zipaquirá extending to the westernmost part of Tocancipá in the department of Cundinamarca, Colombia. The several hundred metres long series of rock shelters is in the north of the Bogotá savanna on the Altiplano Cundiboyacense, Eastern Ranges of the Colombian Andes at an altitude of 2,570 metres (8,430 ft). The rock shelter and cave system is one of the first evidences of human settlement in the Americas, dated at 12,400 ± 160 years BP. The site was used by the hunter-gatherers of the Late Pleistocene epoch.

== Etymology ==
The name El Abra is taken from a large hacienda of that name at the foot of the western portion of the rock formation. The eastern side of the outcropping sandstones is accessible. Climbing activities at these Rocas de Sevilla are organised.

== Stratigraphy ==
The first research in the place was conducted in 1967, and the stratigraphy of lithic instruments, bones and vegetal charcoal with radiocarbon dating established the date of the settlement in 12,400 ± 160 years BP.

== Archaeological research ==
El Abra and other prehistoric sites on the Bogotá savanna

In the late 1960s, the Indiana University collaborated in a deeper research. In 1970, the Dutch Foundation for the Advancement of Tropical Research (NWO-WOTRO) discovered four new preceramic sites and the analysis of lacustrine sediments allowed a more accurate understanding of the paleoclimate and flora.

=== Fúquene stadial ===
The Fúquene stadial, named after Lake Fúquene, close to the village of the same name, is defined from 15,000 to 12,500 BP. It is characterized by a cold climate, flora typical of páramo ecosystems, and lithic tools.

=== Guantivá interstadial ===
About 12,500 years ago, a gradual rise of temperature allowed the return of Andean cloud forest and the settlement of many animal species, making hunting easier. Artefacts of this period are called abriense: flint (tool)s, and chopper cores. As the climate was more benign, the cave system was gradually abandoned.

=== Tibitó stadial ===
The excavations of this period, near Tocancipá at Tibitó, dated at 11,400 years BP, show lithic instruments, bone tools and remains of Pleistocene megafauna, such as mastodons (Haplomastodon waringi and Cuvieronius hyodon), American horse (Equus amerhipuus lasallei), and deer (Odocoileus virginianus) with traces of ritual ceremonies.

=== El Abra stadial ===
Dated 11,000 BP, it is characterized by a new cooling of the climate, recession of the forests and a last period of extending glaciations. From this period the archaeological site of Tequendama in Soacha shows lithic instruments (Tequendamenses tools) with a more smooth manufacture, many of them made with materials brought to this place from the Magdalena River valley, such as quartzite. At Tequendama, evidence for domestication of guinea pigs has been uncovered.

=== Holocene ===
Around 10,000 years BP, the last glaciation ended and the Andean forests appeared again. The lithic instruments show a rise in recollecting activities, with rodents and vegetables consumed, and lower amounts of large animals hunted. The El Abra caves were abandoned gradually, while other nearby rock shelters like Nemocón and open area settlements as Checua were populated.

=== Aguazuque ===
.

In Aguazuque, around 5,000 BP, agriculture was established on elevated terraces, grinding stone instruments can be observed in association with itinerant habits. The abriense type instruments disappear.

== Tourism ==
While access to the western Zipaquirá part of the rock formation is restricted as it is located on private lands, the eastern area in Tocancipá is accessible and around 20 climbing routes have been constructed. The climbing is comparable but more challenging than the famous routes of Suesca, due to the overhanging character of the formation.

== Gallery ==
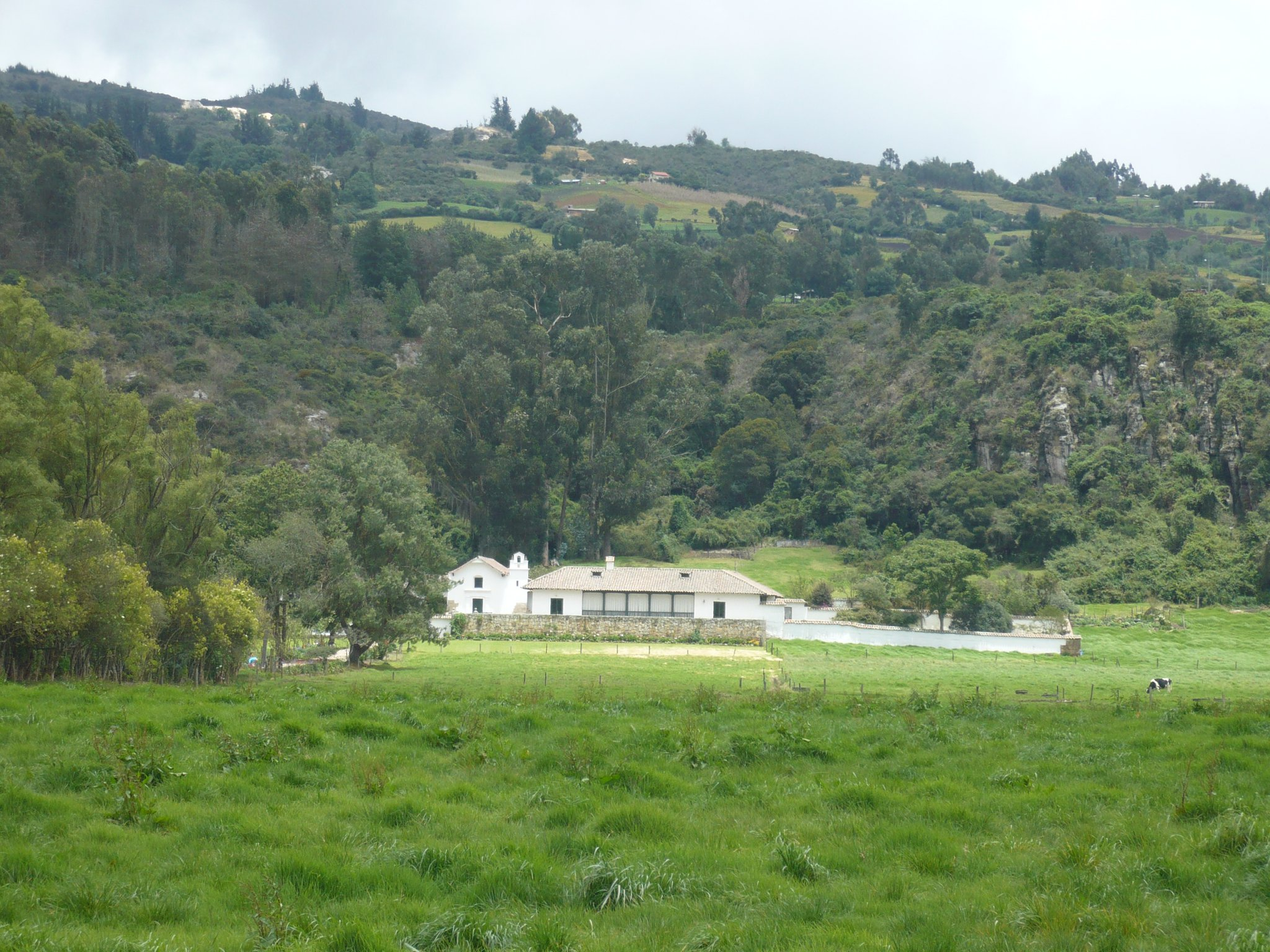
Hacienda El Abra

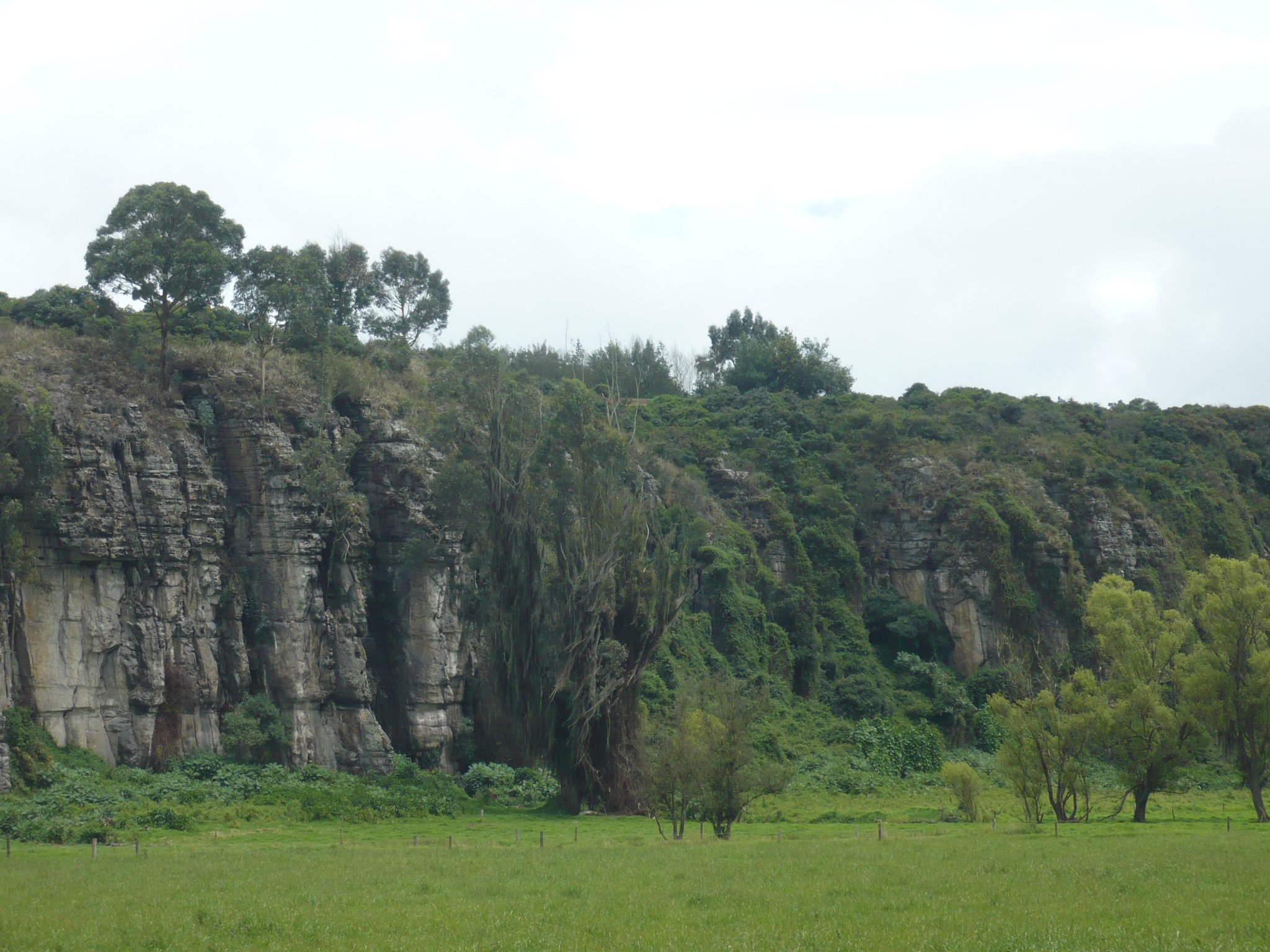
Rock formation of El Abra

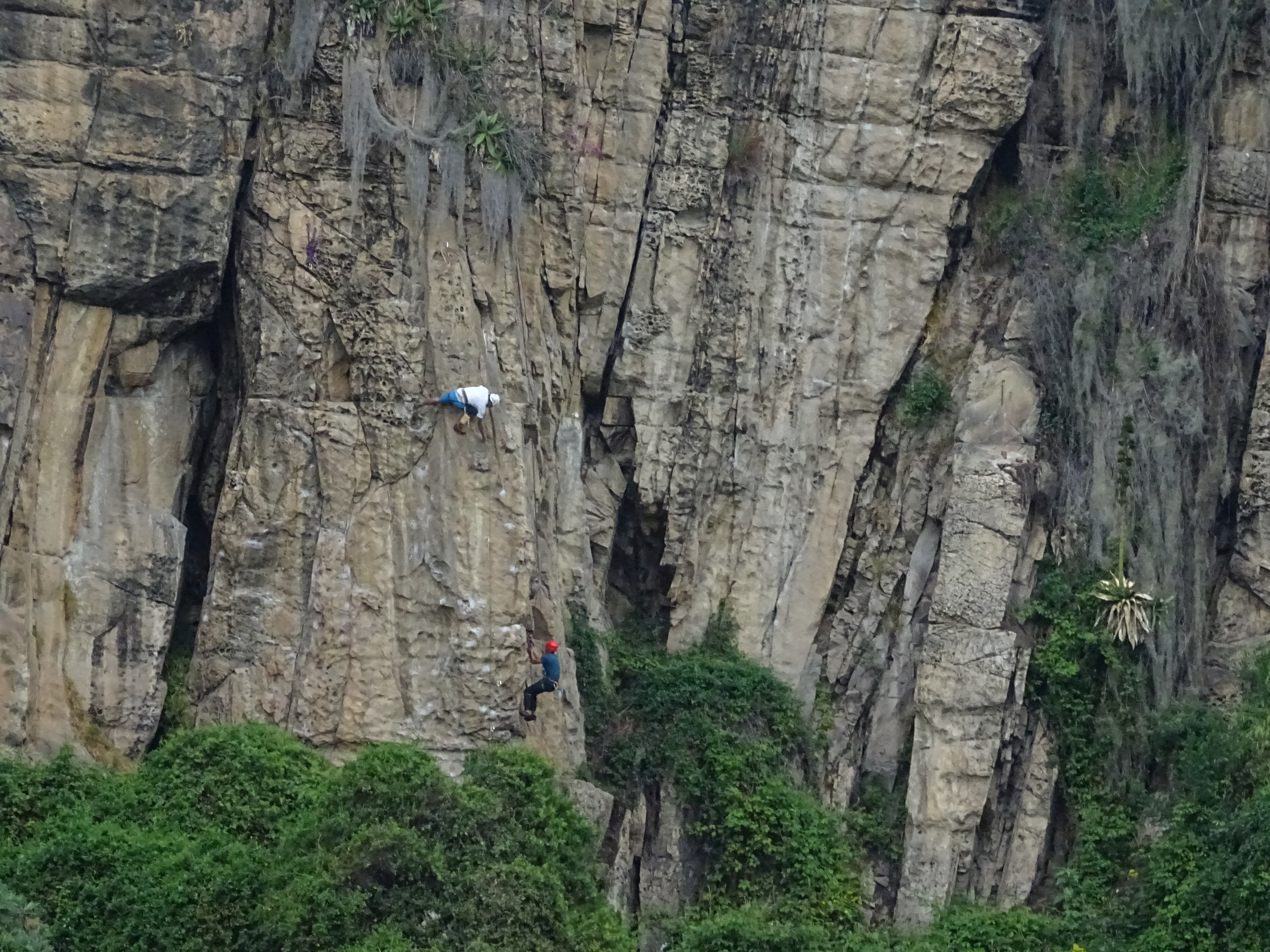
Climbing at El Abra

== See also ==
- List of Muisca and pre-Muisca sites
- Andean preceramic
- Aguazuque, Checua, Tequendama, Tibitó
