= Checua =

Early archaeological site in Colombia

- Location within Colombia
- 5°07′12.1″N 73°52′35.3″W
- Type: Open area settlement
- Periods: Preceramic
- Cultures: Preceramic
- Location: Nemocón, Cundinamarca
- Region: Bogotá savanna Altiplano Cundiboyacense; Colombia
- Part of: Pre-Muisca sites

Site notes
- Elevation: 2,577 m (8,455 ft)
- Archaeologists: Ana María Groot

Checua is a preceramic open area archaeological site in Nemocón, Cundinamarca, Colombia. The site is located 7 kilometres (4.3 mi) north of the town centre. At Checua, thousands of stone and bone tools, stone flakes and human remains have been found, indicating human occupation from around 8500 to 3000 years BP.

A prominent archaeologist for Checua is Ana María Groot, who published the results of her research in 1992. In August 2025, it was reported that human remains from the area dated to about 6000 years BP which had their genome fully sequenced for the first time, represented a previously unknown human lineage, with no known descendants.

== Background ==
Checua and other preceramic sites on the Bogotá savanna

The Altiplano Cundiboyacense has been inhabited at least since 12,500 years ago. The first human settlers migrated via the Darién Gap from Central America to South America and led a hunter-gatherer lifestyle. They populated the rock shelters of the high plateau in the Andes, then still with abundant Pleistocene megafauna as Cuvieronius, Haplomastodon, Equus amerhippus and giant sloths.

During this preceramic phase, the population shifted from rock shelters to open area settlement, of which Galindo and Checua are among the oldest. A later site in Soacha, Cundinamarca; Aguazuque is comparable to Checua.

During the second millennium before present, the population increased and settlements became bigger. This is evidenced in the findings at the salt mine of Nemocón.

== Description ==
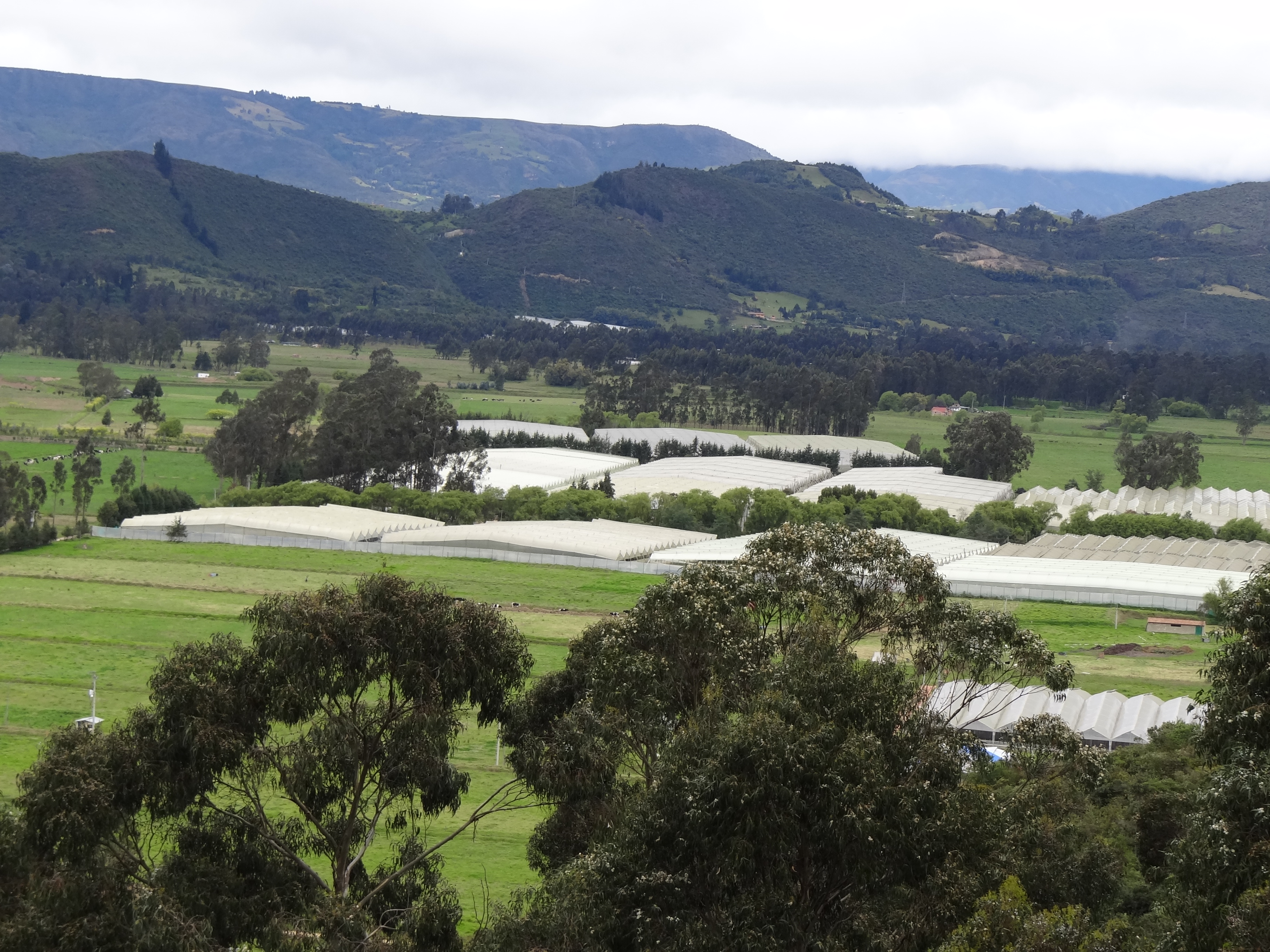
The landscape around Nemocón is hilly with flat valleys. Checua is an open area settlement, located north of the urban centre

=== Geology ===
Checua is located in a valley of the Altiplano Cundiboyacense and its geology is determined by the Andean orogeny. Checua lies in the middle of a rich halite area, with salt mines in Nemocón, Zipaquirá and Tausa surrounding the site. The sedimentary sequence consists of the oldest outcropping units of the Villeta Group of Early Cretaceous age. This sequence is followed by the sandstone formations of the Guadalupe Group, Late Cretaceous in age. Overlying the Mesozoic section is the Maastrichtian to Paleocene Guaduas Formation. Due to the Andean tectonic movements, most of the Tertiary section is eroded or non-deposited and the Guaduas Formation is overlain by the Pleistocene Sabana Formation.

=== Climate ===
The climate of the area around Checua is constant throughout the year with an average maximum temperature of 21.9 °C (71.4 °F) and an average minimum of 3.05 °C (37.49 °F). The yearly precipitation varies from 600 millimetres (24 in) to 750 millimetres (30 in), mostly in short erosional showers. The winds can be strong and aid the erosive process of the water.

=== Vegetation ===
The vegetation was of a lower altitude dry forest type with native species Dodanae viscosa, Baccharis sp., Prunus capuli, Xilosma speculiferum, Duratana mutissi, Lupinus sp., dividivi (Tara spinosa), Solanum sp., Hesperolemes heterophyla and fique (Agave sp.).

=== Stone tools ===
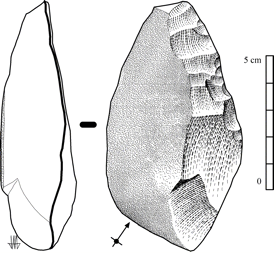
Lithic scraper tool

The Checua site has been divided into nine stratigraphical units of sands and clays. More than 1750 lithic tools have been found in the units, with a highest frequency in units 4 and 5b. They mostly consist of scrapers and knives. Furthermore, 2820 stone flakes, interpreted as materials to build tools have been discovered, with a highest frequency in unit 8.

=== Bone tools ===
Various bone tools have been found in Checua. The type is very similar to those found at Aguazuque and Tequendama. Apart from tools, also a musical instrument made from bone has been uncovered. This bone flute was discovered in stratigraphic unit 5b at a depth of 60 centimetres (2.0 ft).

=== Tooth enamel ===
Dating of the tooth enamel of one of the remains, using Electronic Paramagnetic Resonance (EPR), provided an age of 7850 ± 190 years BP. Using the same method, in 2014 another tooth enamel was analysed, providing an age of 5021 ± 202 years BP.

== Human occupation phases ==
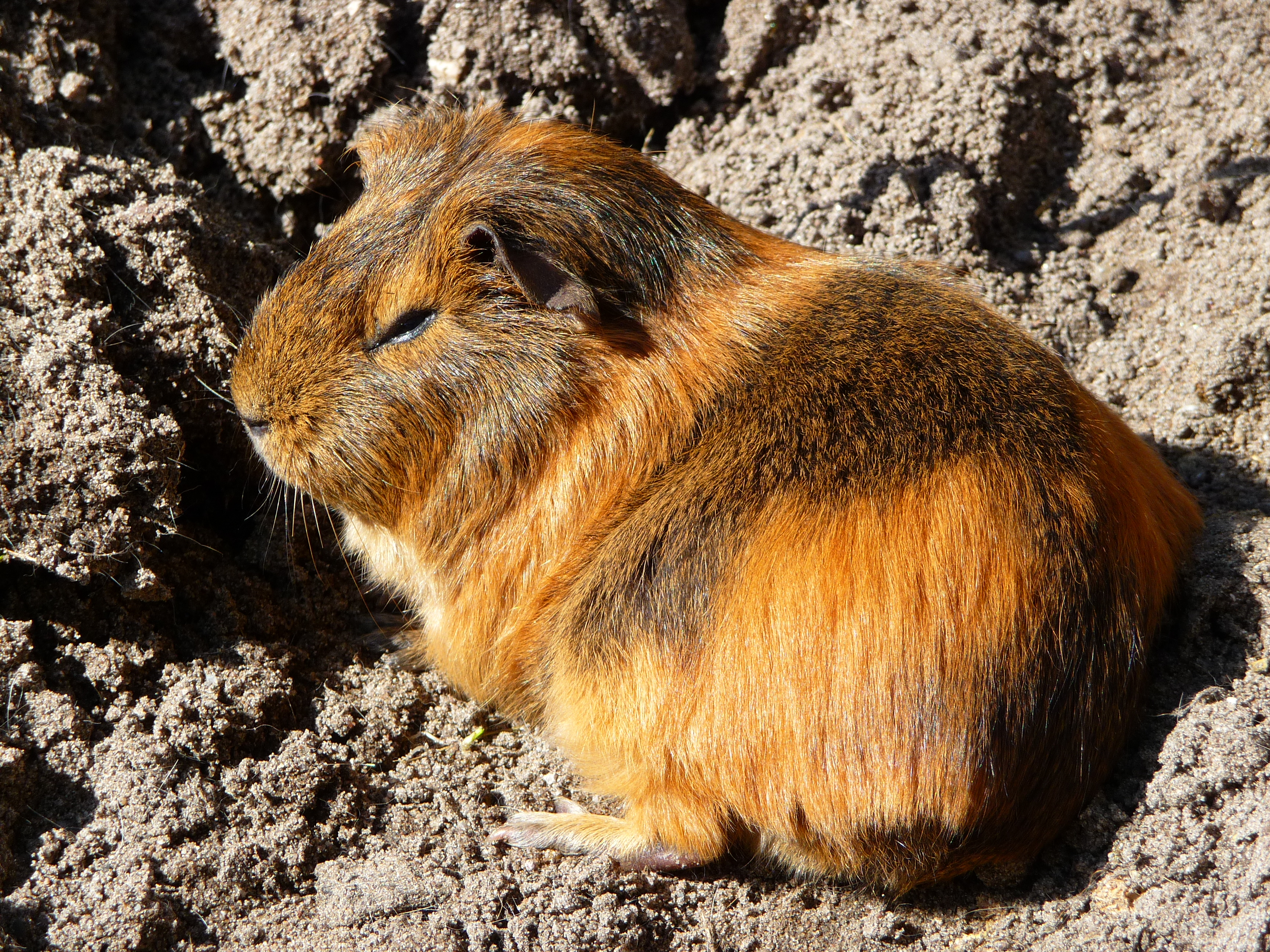
As at Tequendama and Aguazuque, abundant remains of the domesticated guinea pig have been found at Checua

Analysis of the various stratigraphic levels and the tools found, led to the identification of four zones of human occupation within a total time span of 5500 years (6500–1000 years BCE). The first zone, dated to about 8500 to 8200 years BP, contains mostly scrapers and perforators used for the elaboration of meat and animal skins. The second zone of occupation, lasting from about 8200 to 7800 years BP, consists of various burial sites. Here, also scrapers and perforators were found, together with the main ingredients of the diet of the people; white tailed deer and guinea pig. In this zone, the bone flute has been unearthed. The third level corresponds to the seventh stratigraphical unit where many bone fragments were found. The unit has been compared to Aguazuque for dating at around 5000 years BP, possibly lasting till 4000 years BP. As is the case with Aguazuque, the fourth and uppermost zone has been disturbed by modern agricultural activities and the presence of glass indicates contamination with postcolonial influence. A top age for the sequence has not been provided, but an occupation until 3000 years BP is suggested.

Timeline of inhabitation of the Altiplano Cundiboyacense, Colombia
Altiplano Muisca Confederation

== See also ==
- List of Muisca and pre-Muisca sites
- Aguazuque, Tequendama, Tibitó, Nemocón
- El Abra, Ana María Groot
