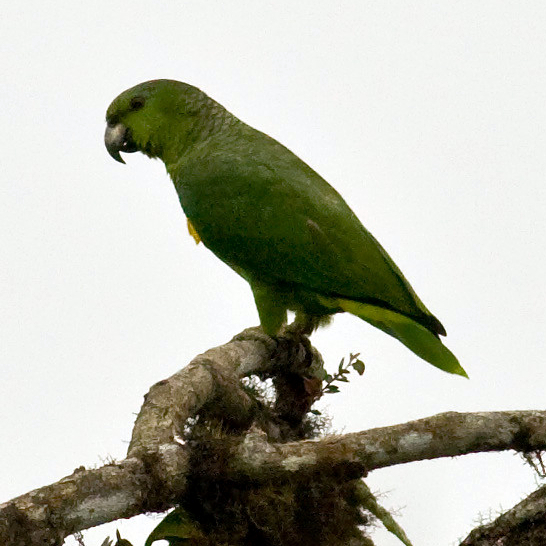
- In the cloud forests of western Andes in Ecuador

Conservation status
- Least Concern (IUCN 3.1)

Scientific classification
- Kingdom: Animalia
- Phylum: Chordata
- Class: Aves
- Order: Psittaciformes
- Family: Psittacidae
- Genus: Amazona
- Species: A. mercenarius

Binomial name
- Amazona mercenarius (Tschudi, 1844)

= Scaly-naped amazon =

Species of bird

The scaly-naped amazon (Amazona mercenarius), also known as the scaly-naped parrot, mercenary amazon, Tschudi's amazon, mountain parrot, or gray-naped amazon is a species of parrot in the family Psittacidae. It is found along the Andes in the northern part of South America. Its natural habitats are subtropical or tropical moist lowland forest and subtropical or tropical moist montane forest.

== Taxonomy and systematics ==
There are two subspecies:

A. m. mercenarius- the nominate subspecies.

A. m. canipalliata- It is similar to the nominate, but has hidden maroon marks instead of the red speculum at the bases of the first to third wing secondaries.

== Description ==
Adults are 34 cm (13.2) long and weigh 300 g (10.5 oz). Nominate forms are bright green in color, with dark green feathers tinged a dull blue/black and tipped with a dull black from the crown to the nape. The eyes are red with a pale gray eye-ring. The first to third secondary wing feathers have red bases, with the remaining wing feathers having green bases. The carpal edge is yellow mixed with red and orange. The tail is green with a yellow-green band, with the side tail feather being banded red and blue-purple and the outermost tail feather being margined with blue-purple. The bill is gray and horn in color. Juveniles are similar in appearance to adults, but possess a pale horn colored bill tinged with gray and brown eyes.

=== Vocalizations ===
It makes a variety of calls and vocalizations. One of the most common is a repeated ka-lee.

== Behavior and ecology ==
It is usually found in pairs or small flocks of birds. Nesting areas usually in inaccessible places. It is described as a shy bird.

=== Diet ===
It has been observed feeding on figs and other fruit. It may also feed on maize. It feeds in the morning and afternoon, with large flocks of birds moving to and from communal roosts to feeding areas.

=== Breeding ===
Its breeding season is from March to May. Nests are usually in inaccessible areas. Eggs are ovate and 35.5 mm × 28.0 mm (1.40 in × 1.10 in) in size.

== Distribution and habitat ==
It is found in Bolivia, Colombia, Ecuador, Peru, and Venezuela. It occurs at elevations of 800–1,900 m (2,600–6,200 ft) above sea level. Within its range, it is usually the only species in its genus present. It inhabits hill and mountain forest in the upper tropical, subtropical and temperate areas. It also lives in open woodland containing large trees, open forest on ridges, and in wooded valleys and ravines in the paramo zone.

== Conservation ==
It is listed as least concern. It has a large range, and although its population has not been quantified, it is thought to be fairly common throughout its range. However, there is evidence that its population may be in decline.
