= Tequendama =

Archaeological site in Colombia

- Location within Colombia
- 4°32′06.42″N 74°16′32.47″W
- Type: Cave, rock shelter
- Periods: Prehistory-Herrera-Muisca
- Cultures: Herrera-Muisca
- Location: Soacha, Cundinamarca
- Region: Altiplano Cundiboyacense, Colombia
- Part of: Pre-Muisca sites

History
- Abandoned: Colonial period (>1537)

Site notes
- Elevation: 2,570 m (8,430 ft)
- Archaeologists: Hammen, Correal
- Public access: Yes

Tequendama and other prehistoric sites on the Bogotá savanna

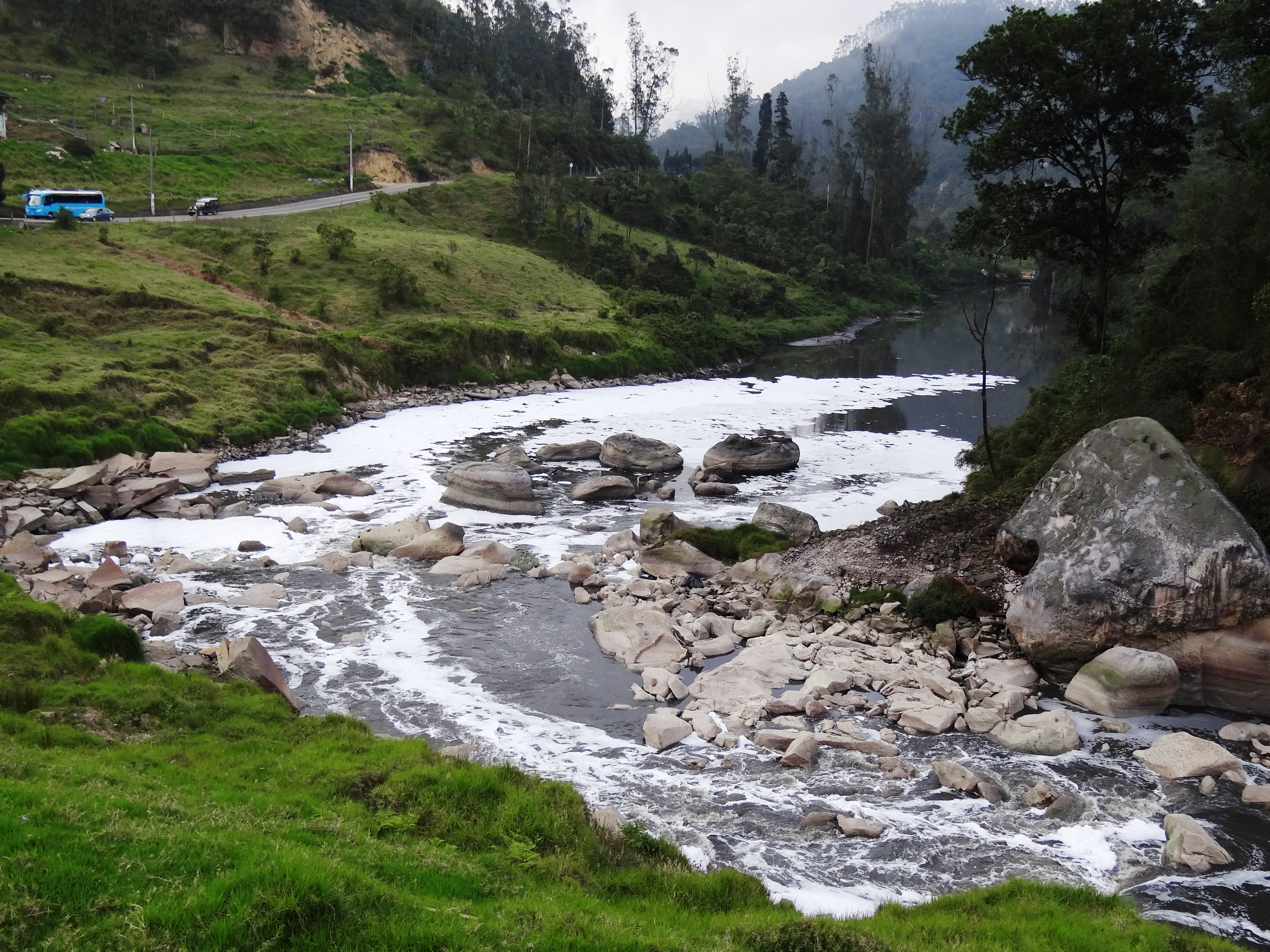
The Bogotá River, close to Tequendama

Tequendama is a preceramic and ceramic archaeological site located southeast of Soacha, Cundinamarca, Colombia, a couple of kilometers east of Tequendama Falls. It consists of multiple evidences of late Pleistocene to middle Holocene population of the Bogotá savanna, the high plateau in the Colombian Andes. Tequendama was inhabited from around 11,000 years BP, and continuing into the prehistorical, Herrera and Muisca periods, making it the oldest site of Colombia, together with El Abra, located north of Zipaquirá. Younger evidences also from the Herrera Period have been found close to the site of Tequendama in Soacha, at the construction site of a new electrical plant. They are dated at around 900 BCE to 900 AD.

The most important researchers who since 1969 contributed on the knowledge about Tequendama were Dutch geologist and palynologist Thomas van der Hammen and archaeologist and anthropologist Gonzalo Correal Urrego.

== Etymology ==
The name Tequendama means in the Muysccubun: "he who precipitates downward".

== Background ==
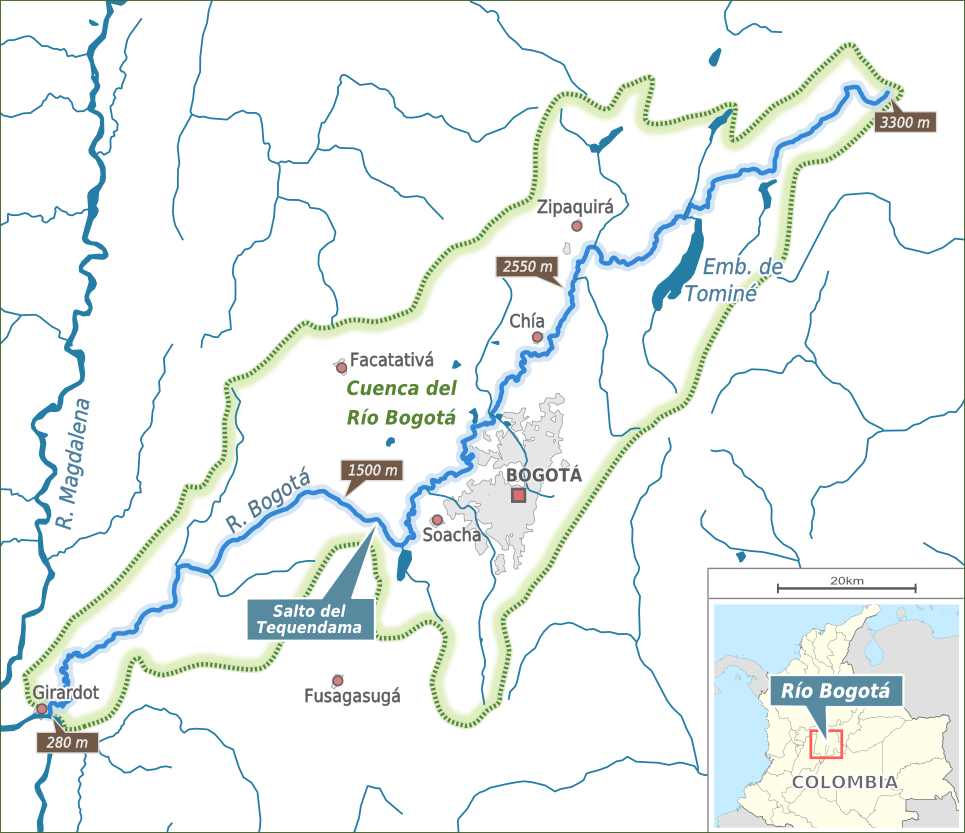
Map of the Bogotá River, Tequendama is situated on the right bank between Soacha and Tequendama Falls

During the time before the Spanish conquest of the Muisca, the central highlands of the Colombian Andes (Altiplano Cundiboyacense) were populated first by prehistorical indigenous groups, then by people from the Herrera Period, and finally by the Muisca.

Various sites of ancient population have been uncovered during the second half of the 20th and early 21st century, such as Tibitó, Aguazuque, Checua, El Abra and Tequendama.

== Description ==
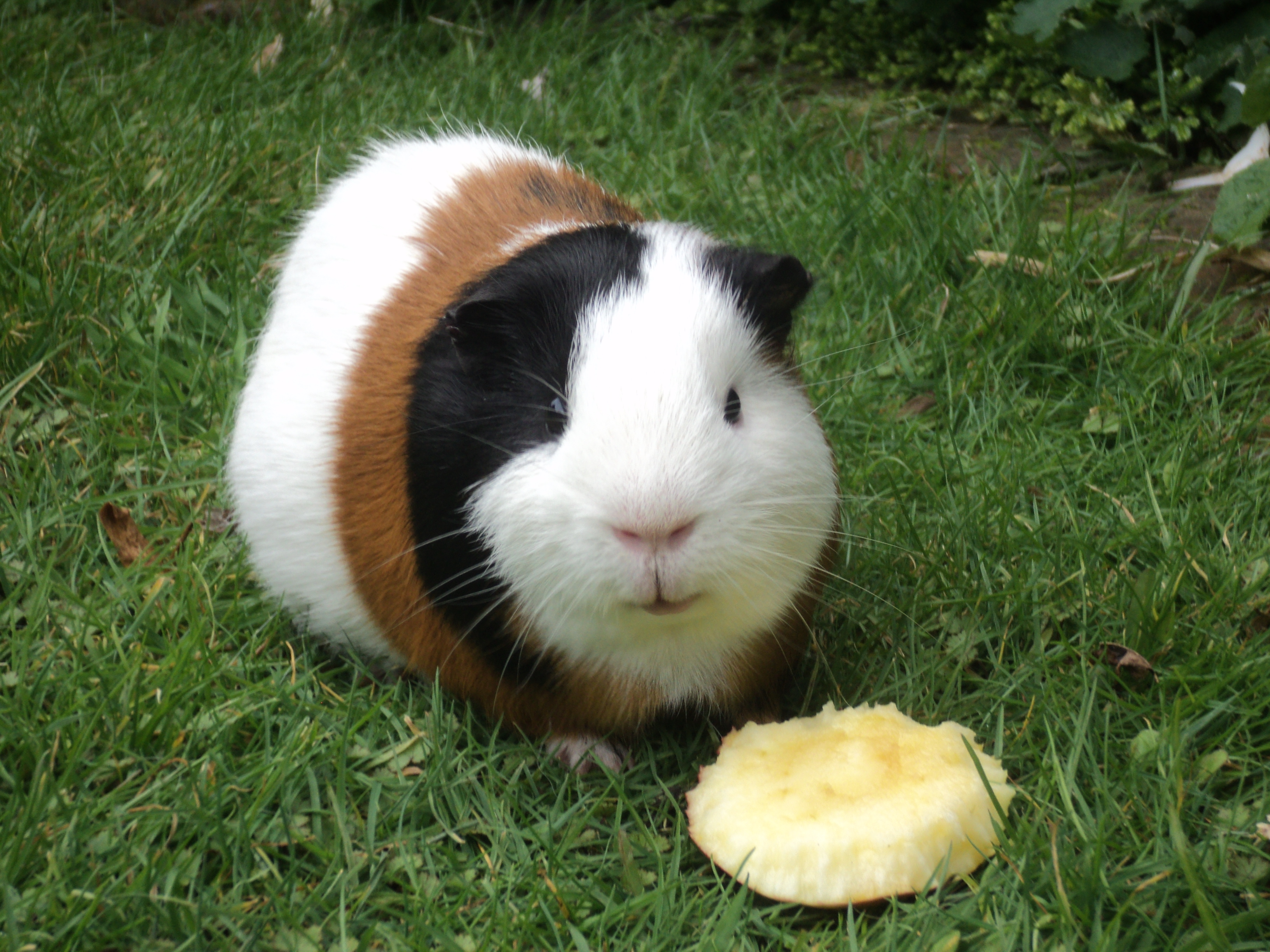
Evidence for the domestication of guinea pigs has been found at Tequendama

The site of Tequendama consists of four cave and overhang locations at close distance to each other, called Tequendama I (~11,000-10,000 years BP), II (9500-8300 BP), III (7000-6000 BP) and IV (2500-450 BP). The cave sites have been inhabited probably because of the access to fresh water; the Bogotá River currently flows very close to the site and also the Funza River was nearby.

During the last phase, Tequendama IV, inside the caves and under the overhanging rocks, living constructions were built. At this time it was already ceramic; evidence of the use of pottery was found. The rock art of Tequendama dates to this last phase. In an area, dated at around 2000 years BP, signs of domestication of guinea pigs have been found.

The sites of Tequendama were probably inhabited by semi-nomadic hunter-gatherer tribes of maximum 15 individuals. Fruits and land snails were among the food of the people, together with deer and rodents. Areas with fire pits have been found, together with hunting tools, as well as evidence of food preparation and consumption. The most dominant knives, used as scraper tools, found in Tequendama II, III and IV, were also the predominant tools of Checua. More to the outside of the overhangs evidence of animal skin processing has been discovered. The waste was collected in a ditch outside of the overhangs.

=== Tequendama I ===
Tequendama I is situated at an altitude of 2,570 metres (8,430 ft) and radiocarbon dating has provided oldest ages between 12,500 and 10,100 years BP. Occupation of Tequendama I continued until approximately 5000 years BP. The first inhabitants have been analysed with the help of the tools of Quaternary geology, as well as using pollen analysis; the dates of 12,500 to 11,000 years BP have been produced. At that time, the paleoclimate was less cold and more humid than today. Lake Fúquene was overflowing rapidly on the Bogotá savanna during this Guantivá interstadial.

During the next phase, of El Abra, dated at 11,000 to 9500 years BP, the climate was colder again and the previously retreating glaciers in the Eastern Ranges of the Colombian Andes were advancing. The people who inhabited the high plateau were hunter-gatherers and mainly consumed white-tailed deer and brocket deer (40% of the remains found), and to a lesser extent cotton rats, guinea pigs, cottontail rabbits and other animals such as the nine-banded armadillo, tayra and kinkajous. The bones found were in most cases fragmented which suggests the people were eating the bone marrow and used them as tools and decoration. Different from the Colombian site of Tibitó, in Tequendama no remains of Pleistocene megafauna have been found.

Following the colder phase, as of 10,000 or 9500 years BP, the Andean forests returned and more evidences of rodents and less of deer have been found at Tequendama.

The tools, mainly made of chert, found at Tequendama I are the result of careful elaboration, more so than at El Abra. More than half of the tools found were primitive knives.

From the 6th millennium BCE (8000 years BP) onwards, the rock shelter areas were less populated; the population seems to have shifted to the plains of the Bogotá savanna.

Twenty bone samples analysed at Tequendama were predominantly males (60%). Children (20%) and women (15%) formed a minor fraction of the remains found. More than 95% of the bones were intact. Evidence of funeral practices have been found at Tequendama. The traditional way of burying the bodies was with their heads towards the east.

== Named after Tequendama ==
Tequendama appears in various present-day names. The public parking company, Parqueaderos Tequendama Ltda., founded in 1985, is named after Tequendama.

- Tequendama Falls (Salto del Tequendama) - 132 metres (433 ft) high waterfall to the west of the Bogotá savanna in the Bogotá River
- Tequendama Falls Museum - museum and former hotel overlooking the waterfall
- Tequendama Province - the province around the falls
- San Antonio del Tequendama - municipality and capital of the Tequendama Province
- Hotel Tequendama - famous hotel in the centre of Bogotá

== See also ==
- List of Muisca and pre-Muisca sites
- Tibitó, Aguazuque, Checua
- El Abra, Piedras del Tunjo, Herrera Period
