= Tocancipá =

- Municipality and town
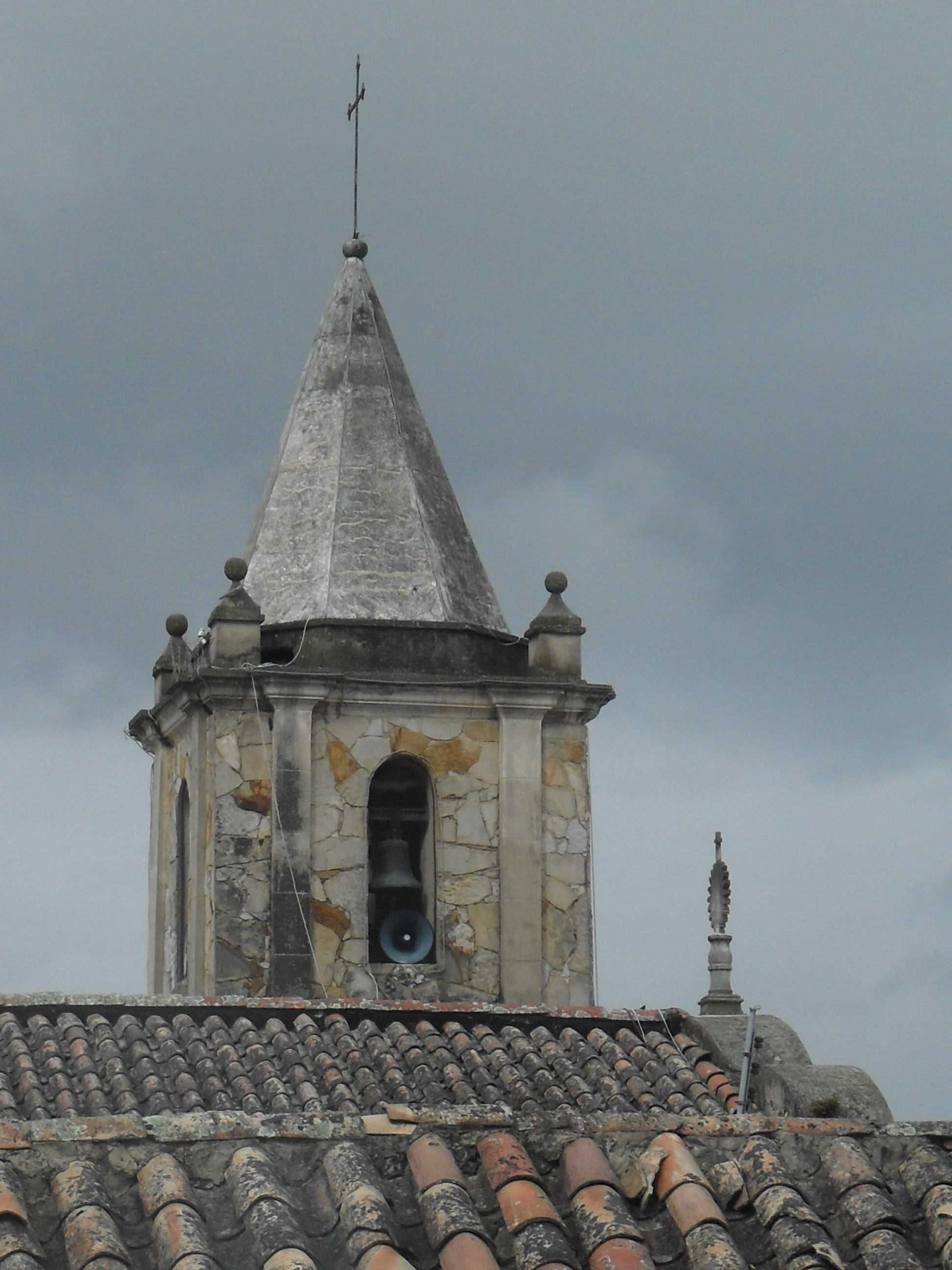
- Church tower of Tocancipá

- Flag Seal
- Etymology: Muysccubun: "Valley of the joys of the zipa"
- Location of the municipality and town inside Cundinamarca Department of Colombia

- Location in Colombia
- Coordinates: 4°57′56.7″N 73°54′48.9″W
- Country: Colombia
- Department: Cundinamarca
- Province: Central Savanna Province
- Founded: 21 September 1593
- Founder: Miguel de Ibarra

Government
  - Mayor: Walfrando Adolfo Forero Bejarano (2016-2019)

Area
  - Municipality and town: 73.24 km^{2} (28.28 sq mi)
  - Urban: 1.62 km^{2} (0.63 sq mi)
- Elevation: 2,605 m (8,547 ft)

Population (2018 census)
  - Municipality and town: 39,996
  - Density: 546.1/km^{2} (1,414/sq mi)
  - Urban: 15,355
  - Urban density: 9,480/km^{2} (24,500/sq mi)
- Time zone: UTC-5 (Colombia Standard Time)
- Website: Official website

Tocancipá (Spanish pronunciation: [tokansiˈpa]) is a municipality and town of Colombia in the Central Savanna Province, part of the department of Cundinamarca. Tocancipá is situated in the northern part of the Bogotá savanna, part of the Altiplano Cundiboyacense in the Eastern Ranges of the Colombian Andes with the urban centre at an altitude of 2,605 metres (8,547 ft). The capital Bogotá, which metropolitan area includes Tocancipá, is 42 kilometres (26 mi) to the south. Tocancipá borders Gachancipá in the north, Guasca and Sopó in the south, Guatavita in the east and Zipaquirá in the west.

== Etymology ==
The name Tocancipá comes from Muysccubun and means "Valley of the joys of the zipa".

== History ==
The area of Tocancipá was inhabited early in the history of inhabitation of the Altiplano. The archaeological site Tibitó is located within the boundaries of Tocancipá and evidence of inhabitation has been dated to 11,740 ± 110 years BP. At the time of arrival of the Spanish conquistadores in 1537, Tocancipá was part of the Muisca Confederation, a loose confederation of different rulers of the Muisca. The zipa of Bacatá ruled over Tocancipá.

Modern Tocancipá was founded on September 21, 1593 by Miguel de Ibarra.

== Tourism ==
Jaime Duque Park, a family-oriented amusement park, is located in Tocancipá. The town also hosts the Autódromo de Tocancipá, a race track where vintage and GT races are held.

== Gallery ==
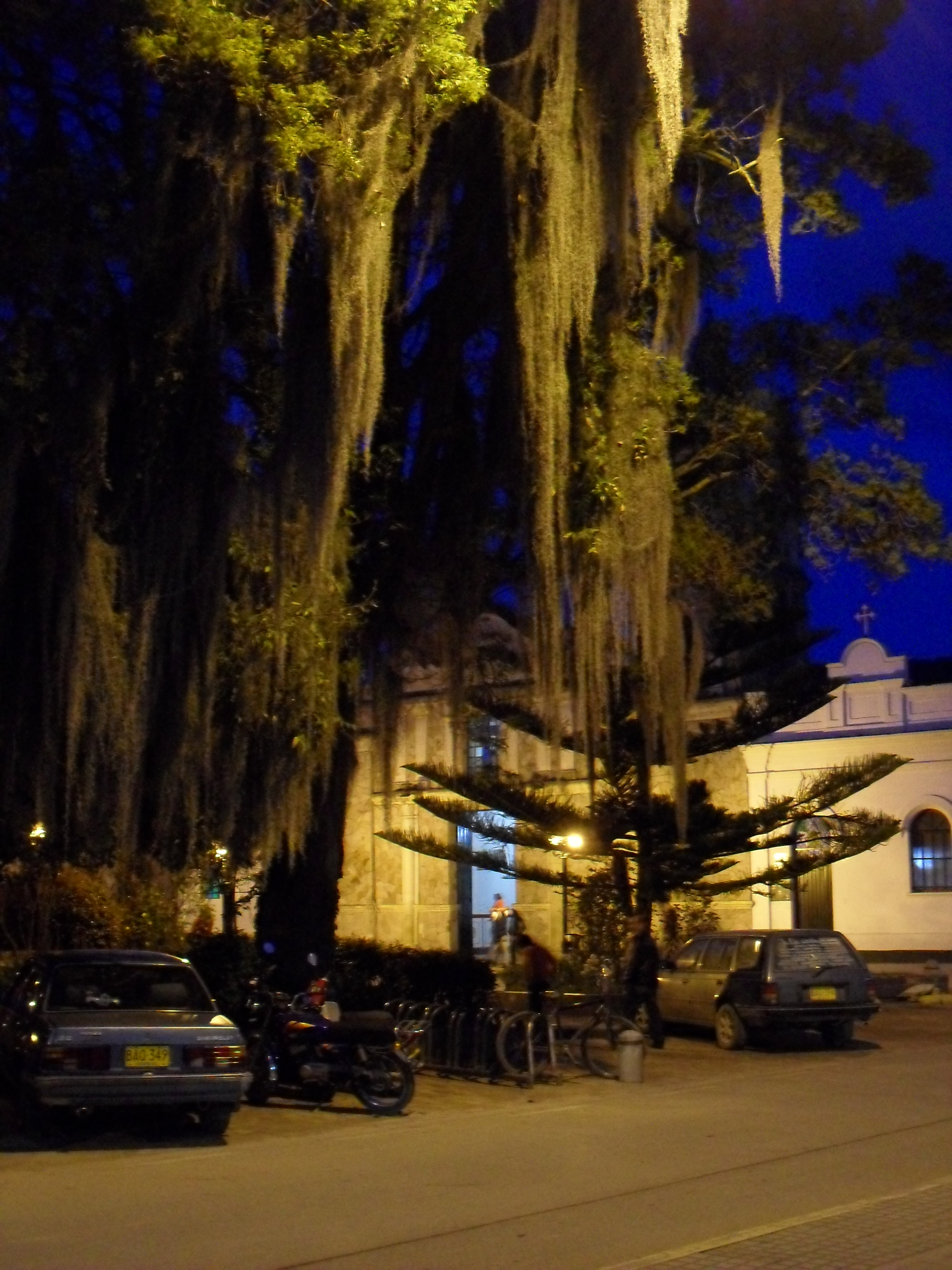
Tree on central square

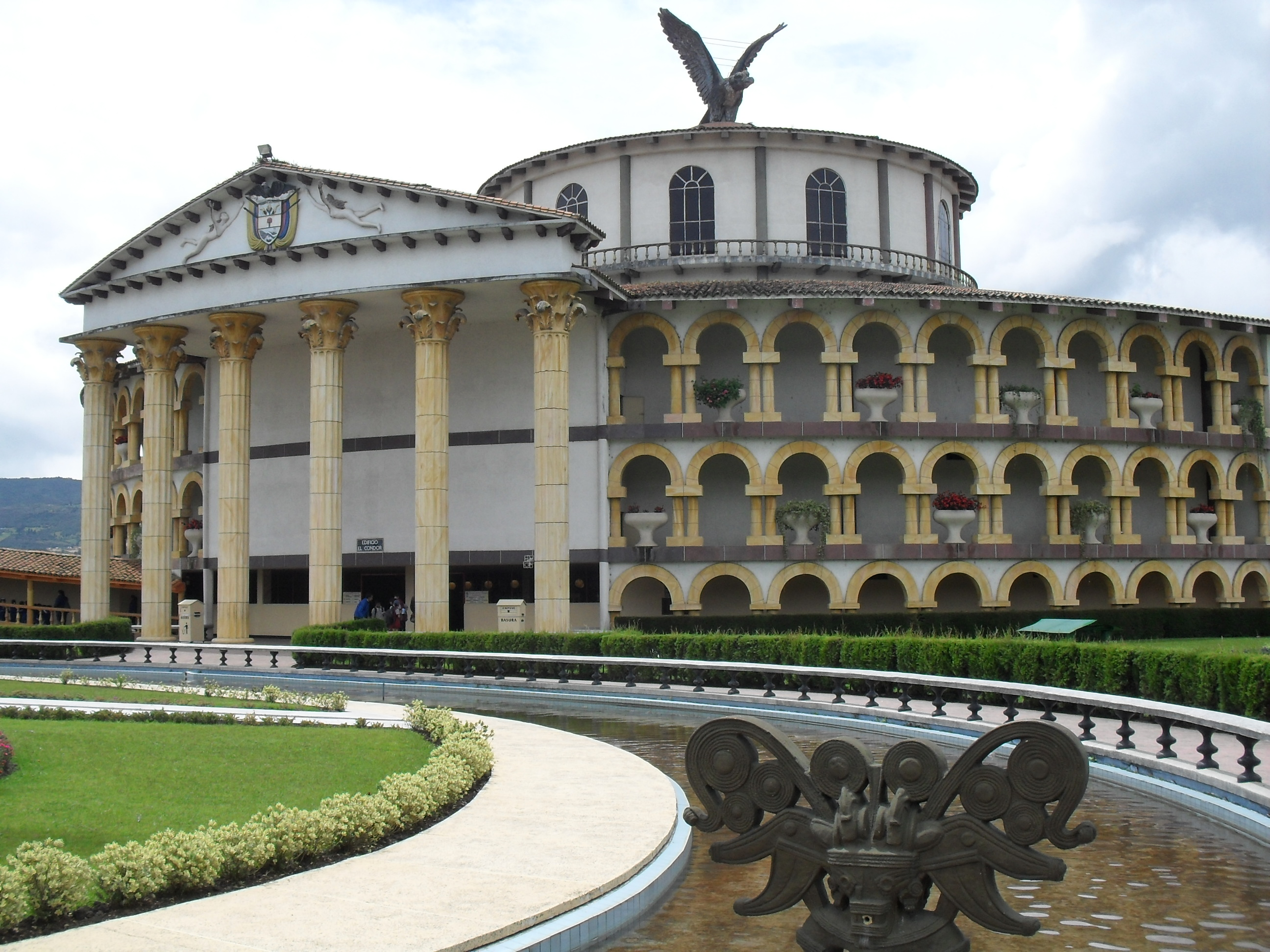
Entrance of Jaime Duque Park

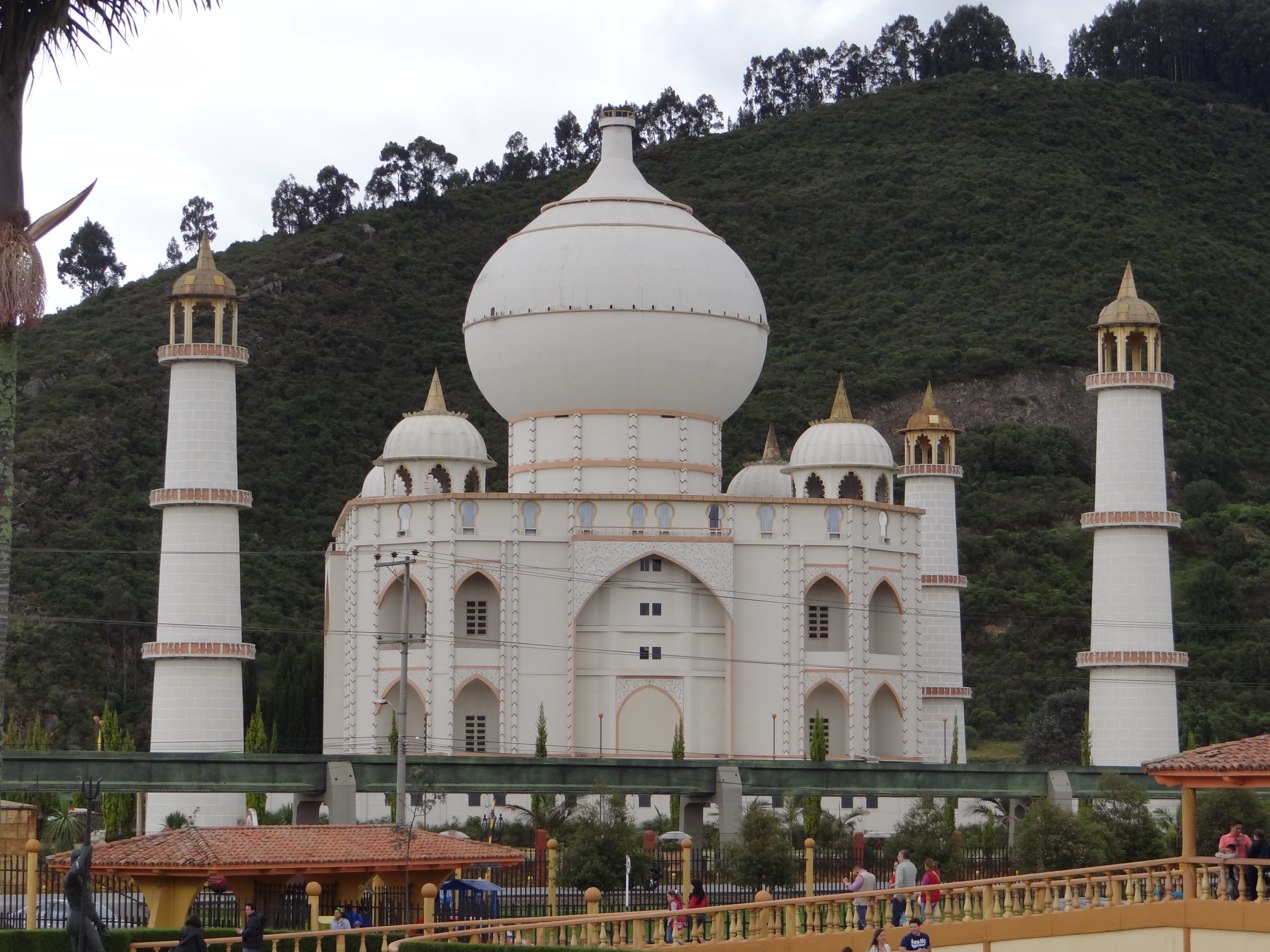
Replica Taj Mahal in Jaime Duque Park

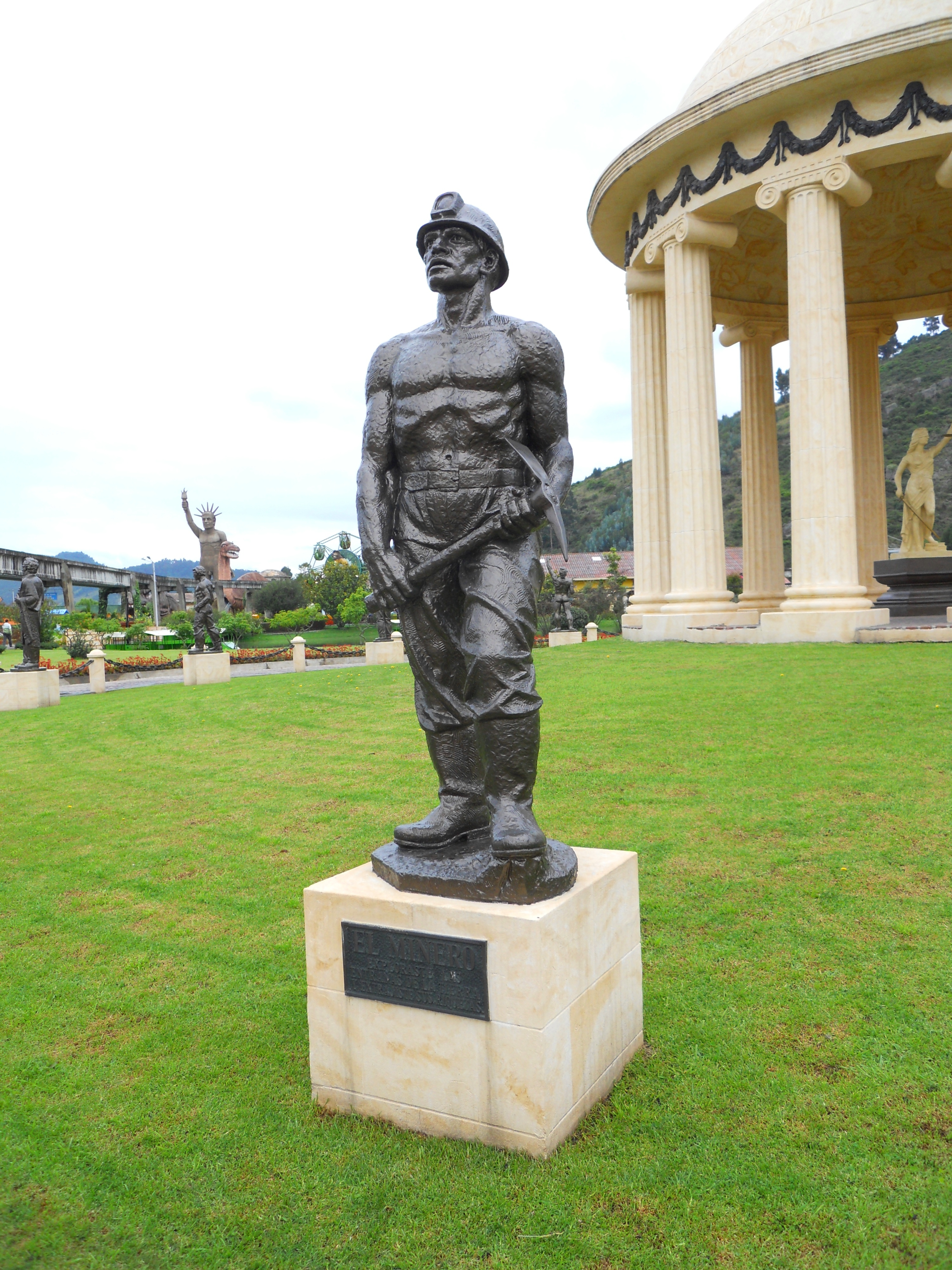
Statue of a miner

Autódromo de Tocancipá

== Bibliography ==
- Aceituno Bocanegra, Francisco Javier; Rojas Mora, Sneider (2012). "Del Paleoindio al Formativo: 10.000 años para la historia de la tecnología lítica en Colombia" [From the Paleoindian to the Formative [Stage]: 10,000 years for the history of lithic technology in Colombia] (PDF). Boletín de Antropología (in Spanish). 28 (43). University of Antioquia: 124–156. ISSN 0120-2510.
