= Tibitó =

Archaeological site on the Altiplano Cundiboyacense, Colombia

- Location within Colombia
- 4°59′08.4″N 73°58′58.4″W
- Type: Rock shelter
- Periods: Prehistory-Herrera
- Cultures: Preceramic-Herrera
- Location: Tocancipá, Cundinamarca
- Region: Bogotá savanna, Altiplano Cundiboyacense, Colombia
- Part of: Pre-Muisca sites

History
- Built: ~11,850 BP

Site notes
- Material: Stone & bone tools Carbon
- Elevation: 2,555 m (8,383 ft)
- Archaeologists: Gonzalo Correal Urrego

Tibitó is the second-oldest dated archaeological site on the Altiplano Cundiboyacense, Colombia. The rock shelter is located in the municipality Tocancipá, Cundinamarca, Colombia, in the northern part of the Bogotá savanna. At Tibitó, bone and stone tools (knives and scrapers mostly) and carbon have been found. Bones from Haplomastodon, Cuvieronius, Cerdocyon and white tailed deer from the deepest human trace containing layer of the site is carbon dated to be 11,740 ± 110 years old. The oldest dated sediments are lacustrine clays from an ancient Pleistocene lake.

Principal research at Tibitó was carried out by Colombian archaeologist Gonzalo Correal Urrego, who also analysed other early sites Tequendama, Aguazuque and El Abra.

== Background ==
Tibitó and other prehistoric sites on the Bogotá savanna

The Altiplano Cundiboyacense, and its southeastern flat portion the Bogotá savanna, were populated by the first humans in the late Pleistocene, as evidenced by finds in Pubenza (16,000 years BP), El Abra, Tibitó and others. Until roughly 30,000 years BP, the Bogotá savanna was covered by a large lake; Lake Humboldt. This glacial lake surrounded by snowy peaks was fed by the glaciers of Sumapaz in the south, based on analysis of debris flow deposits close to Fusagasugá, yielding ages between 40,000 and 7000 years BP. The approximately 4,500 square kilometres (1,700 sq mi) large lake contained an island, presently known as the Suba Hills (Cerros de Suba), in Bogotá. Surrounding the lake, Pleistocene megafauna as Glyptodonts, giant sloths, mastodons and deer foraged. The lake retreated during the last 30,000 years, but remnants still existing today are the Bogotá River and its tributaries, Lake Herrera and the many Wetlands of Bogotá. The timber line around Lake Humboldt, in older texts named Lake Bogotá, has been estimated to have been 1,000 metres (3,300 ft) lower than today.

During the latest Pleistocene and early Holocene, the first humans arrived on the Andean high plateau at 2,650 metres (8,690 ft) above sea level. They settled in caves and rock shelters in various locations on the Altiplano and had a hunter-gatherer lifestyle. The main ingredient of the early diet existing until colonial times was white tailed deer (Odocoileus virginianus). Fishing in the many lakes that existed in those times was another source of food for the people.

Timeline of inhabitation of the Altiplano Cundiboyacense, Colombia
Altiplano Muisca Confederation

== Description ==
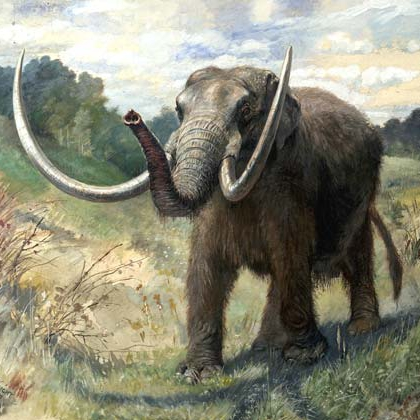
When the first human settlers arrived at Tibitó, mastodons were still extant and served as food and bone tool source for the people

Radiocarbon dating of a deeper lacustrine clay in the sequence of Tibitó revealed the site was in a lake environment around 52,000 years BP. Pleistocene lakes also existed in the Ubaté-Chiquinquirá Valley to the northwest and in the valley of Soatá, in the lower altitude northeasternmost part of the Muisca Confederation. The paleoclimate changed over the course of the latest Pleistocene and the Upper Pleniglacial was relatively humid, eroding earlier lagunal clays. The latest stage of the Pleniglacial was characterised by a cold and dry climate. In the valleys, hunter-gatherers lived. The original topography was covered in the Guantivá interstadial and El Abra stadial by humic sediments.

At Tibitó remains of the extinct Pleistocene megafauna Cuvieronius, Haplomastodon and Equus amerhippus and extant white tailed deer and crab-eating fox have been found set in a circle. The bones were burnt and unburnt and mixed with stone artifacts and limestone chunks. The most important finds of Cuvieronius come from the Eastern Cordillera, with main sites Tibitó and Mosquera. 156 unifacial stone artifacts, of which 41% knives, pieces of carbon and bone tools have been found and analysed by Gonzalo Correal Urrego. Ninetynine percent of the finds were from local origin. The bones, showing a relative higher abundance of Haplomastodon than Cuvieronius and the extinct American horse, have been carbon dated to be 11,740 ± 110 years old. This was confirmed by palynological analysis, that also indicated a páramo climate at the time. This makes the site slightly younger than the oldest; El Abra, dated at 12,400 ± 160 years BP.

In the vicinity of Tibitó, rock art has been discovered.

== See also ==
- List of Muisca and pre-Muisca sites
- Aguazuque, Tequendama, Checua
- El Abra, Gonzalo Correal Urrego
