= Chopper core =

Type of stone tool

In archaeology a chopper core is a suggested type of stone tool created by using a lithic core as a chopper following the removal of flakes from that core. They may be a very crude form of early handaxe although they are not bifacially-worked and there is debate as to whether chopper cores were ever used as tools or simply discarded after the desired flakes were removed.

They are found in the early Mode 1 tool industries of the Oldowan and Clactonian industries during the Lower Palaeolithic.
