= Herrera Period =

Period of Colombian history

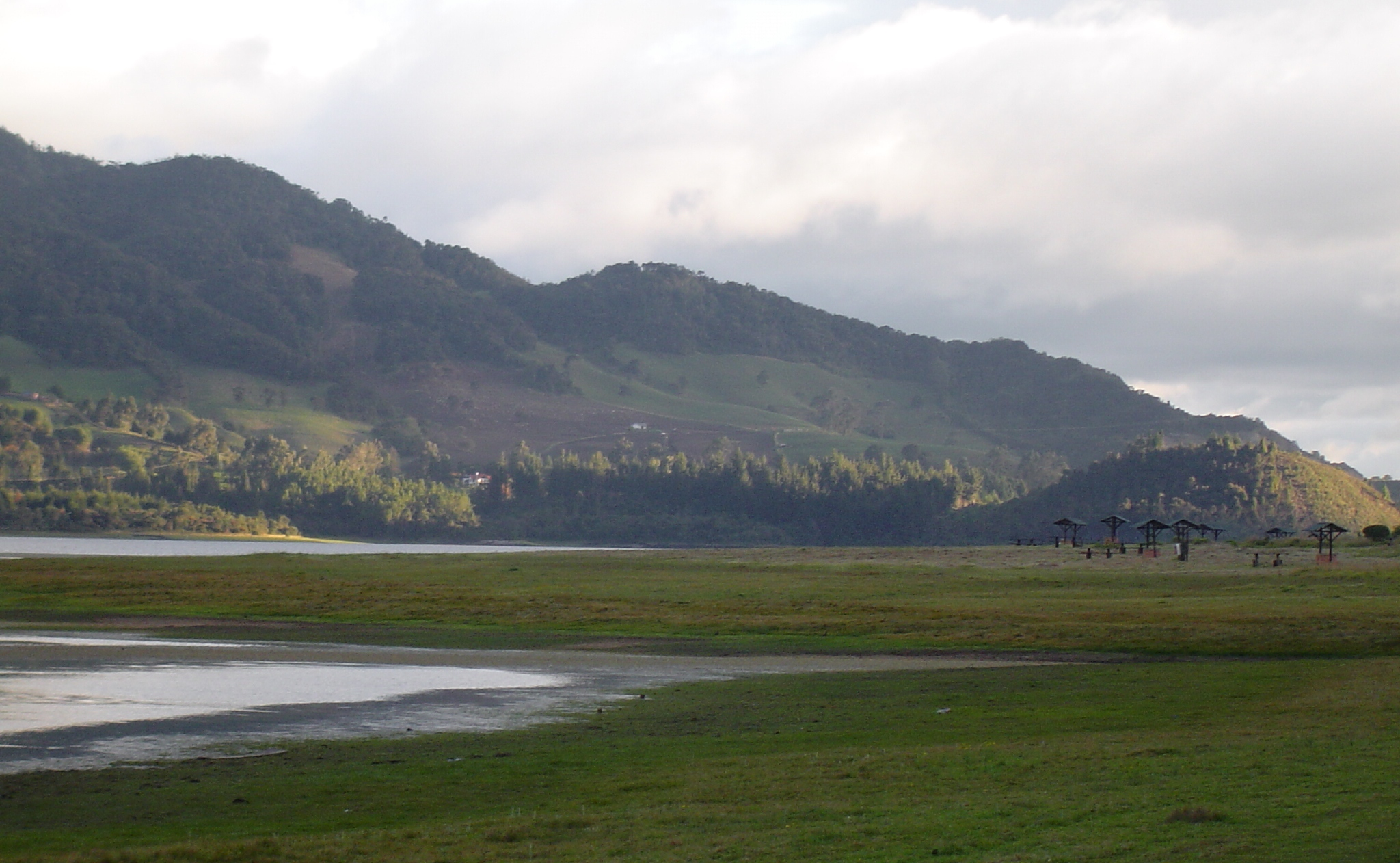
The Bogotá savanna, home to the people from the Herrera Period

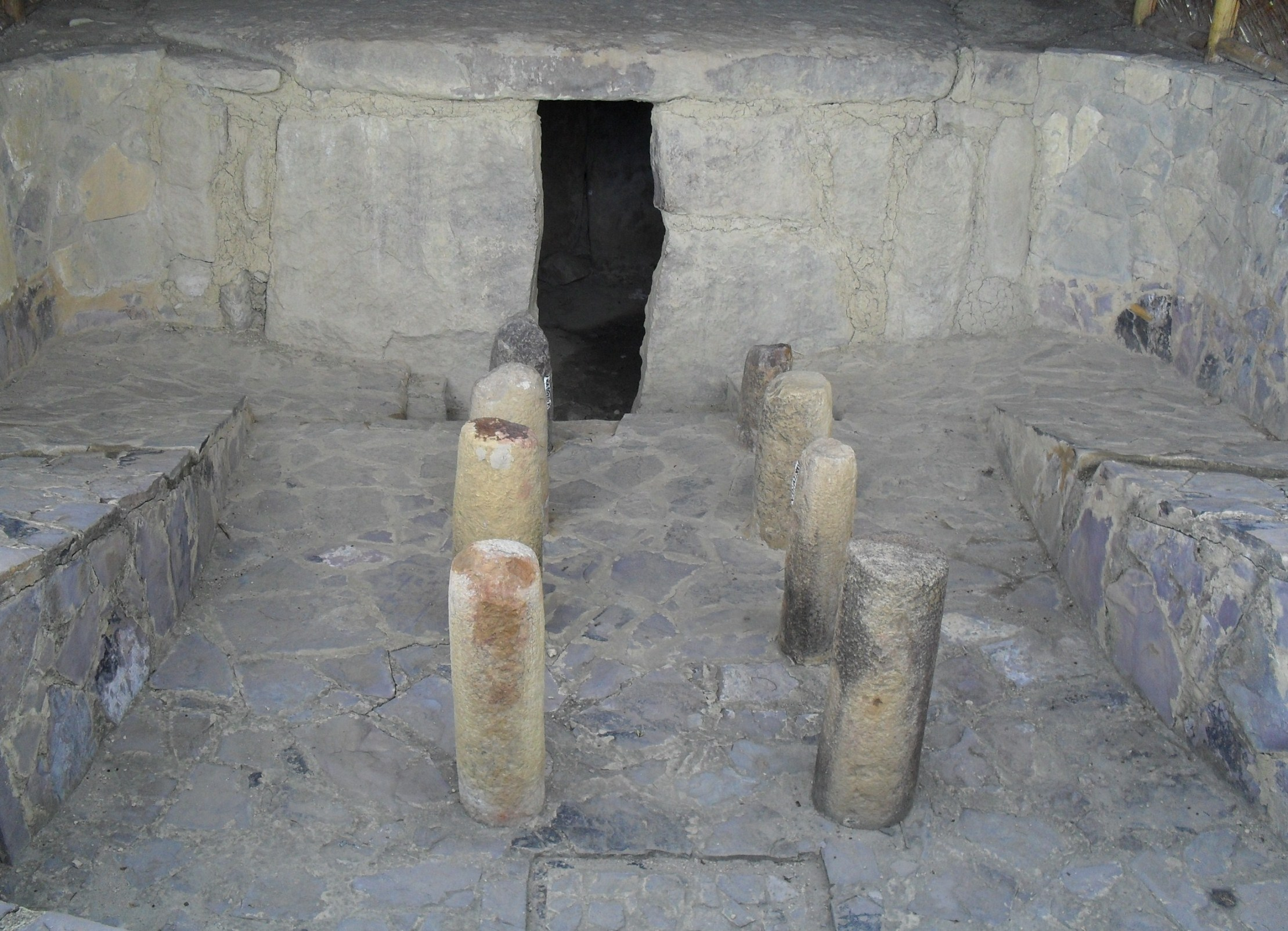
Dolmen at El Infiernito, site from the Herrera Period

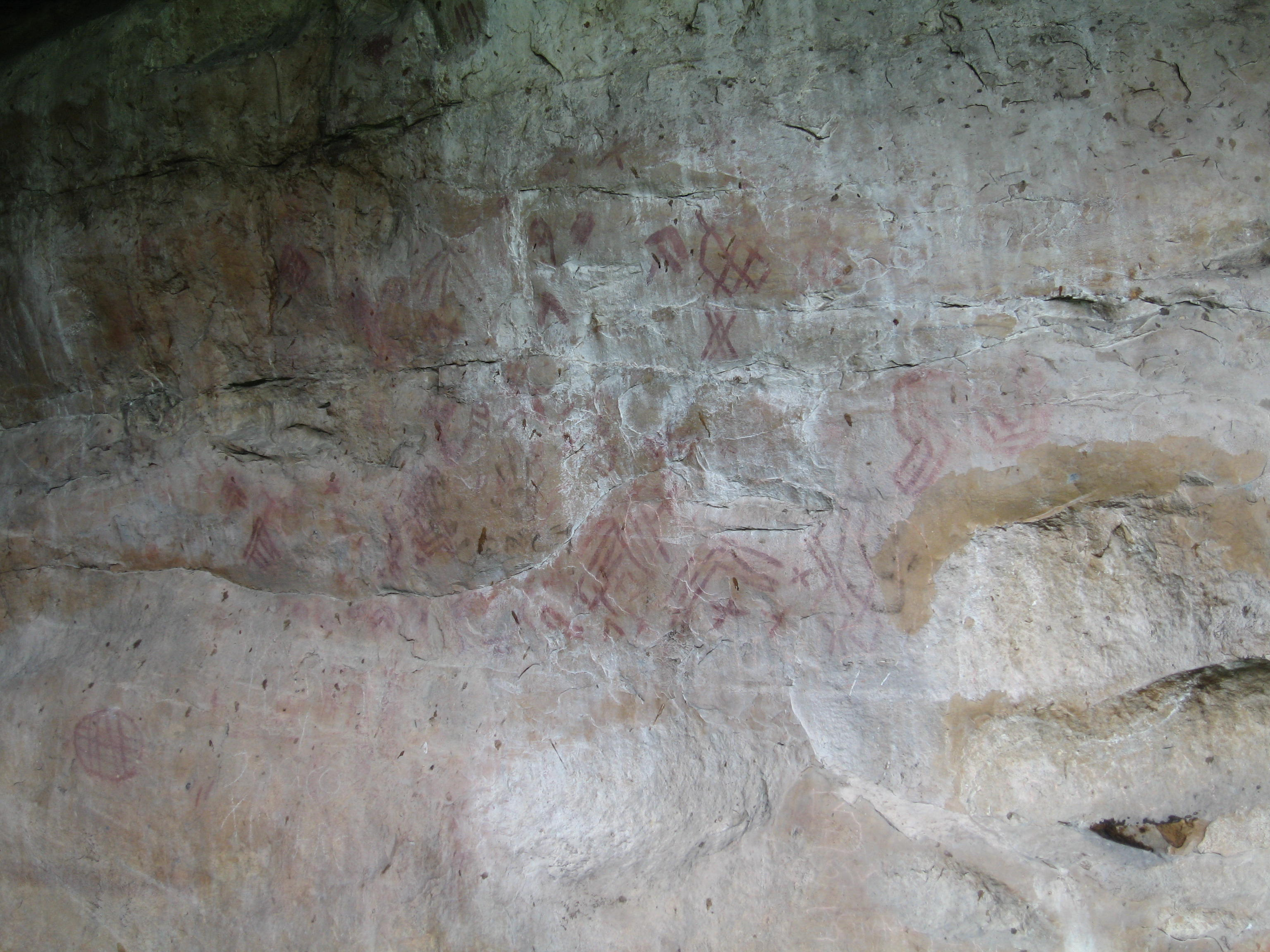
Pictographs at Piedras del Tunjo Archaeological Park, site from the Herrera Period

The Herrera Period is a phase in the history of Colombia. It is part of the Andean preceramic and ceramic, time equivalent of the North American pre-Columbian formative and classic stages and age dated by various archaeologists. The Herrera Period predates the age of the Muisca, who inhabited the Altiplano Cundiboyacense before the Spanish conquest of the Muisca and postdates the prehistory of the region in Colombia. The Herrera Period is usually defined as ranging from 800 BCE to 800 CE, although some scholars date it as early as 1500 BCE.

Ample evidence of the Herrera Period has been uncovered on the Altiplano Cundiboyacense. The main archaeologists contributing to the present knowledge about the Herrera Period are the scholars Ana María Groot, Gonzalo Correal Urrego, Thomas van der Hammen, Carl Henrik Langebaek Rueda, Sylvia M. Broadbent, and Marianne Cardale de Schrimpff.

== Etymology ==
The Herrera Period is named after Lake Herrera (Laguna de la Herrera) where archaeologist Silvia Broadbent performed the first excavations on the Herrera Period in 1971. Lake Herrera is one of the many remnants of the ancient Lake Humboldt, a Pleistocene lake that existed on the Bogotá savanna. The lake with an approximate surface area of 280 hectares (30,000,000 sq ft) is situated at an altitude of 2,550 metres (8,370 ft) within the boundaries of the Cundinamarca municipality Mosquera, close to Madrid and Bojacá. The site of Lake Herrera (Laguna de la Herrera) is close to the archaeological site of Aguazuque.

== Background ==
The region of the Herrera Period and later Muisca Confederation, the Altiplano Cundiboyacense; high plateau of the central Colombian Andes has been inhabited since 12,400 years BP. The earliest evidence for inhabitation (lithic tools) are found in El Abra and Tequendama. This lithic period is roughly defined as from 12,400 to 1000 BCE. Later sites are Aguazuque and Checua.

Agriculture started around 5000 years before present which led to the development of more complex societies, of which the Herrera Period is one of many in the Andean civilizations. Early evidence of inhabitation has been found in Zipacón and is dated at 3270 BCE. From the Herrera Period ceramic has been found. The oldest ceramic evidence found dates to 2500 BP (500 BCE), except for one piece found near Tocarema and dated at 2750 BP.

The people from the Herrera Period performed agriculture, as evidenced in among others the Thomas van der Hammen Reserve, named after Dutch geologist and botanist Thomas van der Hammen.

The Late Herrera Period coincides with the Nahuange Period (200–900) of the Tairona.

== Archaeological sites ==
Archaeological evidence of the Herrera Period has been found in numerous places on the Altiplano Cundiboyacense, among others in Sopó, Soacha, Usme, Iza, Gámeza, Facatativá (Piedras del Tunjo Archaeological Park), Moniquirá (El Infiernito), Chía, Chita, Chiscas, Soatá, Jericó, Sativasur, Covarachía, Sativanorte and El Cocuy.

The site in Soacha is one of the most important finds from the Herrera Period, dating from 400 BCE onwards, into the age of the Muisca. At the site the remains of 2200 individual people, 274 complete ceramic pots, stone tools, seeds of cotton, maize, beans and curuba, 634 fragmented and intact spindles and 100 tunjos not used for offerings have been found in Soacha.

== Timeline ==
Timeline of inhabitation of the Altiplano Cundiboyacense, Colombia
Altiplano Muisca Confederation

== Classifications ==
Over the years and based on new findings, various authors have defined periods of Herrera and Muisca. Regional variations also exist, listed below.

Author	Name	Start age	End age	Notes
Romano, 2003	Early Herrera	900 BCE	0	
Romano, 2003	Late Herrera	0	700	
Romano, 2003	Early Muisca	700	1100	
Romano, 2003	Late Muisca	1100	1600	
Kruschek, 2003	Herrera	800 BCE	800	
Kruschek, 2003	Early Muisca	800	1200	
Kruschek, 2003	Late Muisca	1200	1600	
Boada, 2003	Herrera	300 BCE	200	
Boada, 2003	Early Muisca	200	1000	
Boada, 2003	Late Muisca	1000	1600	
Cárdenas & Kleef, 1996	Herrera	1500 BCE	800	
Cárdenas & Kleef, 1996	Muisca	800	1600	
Peña, 1991	Early Herrera	14th century BCE	4th century BCE	
Peña, 1991	Middle Herrera	4th century BCE	1st century CE	
Peña, 1991	Late Herrera	6th century CE	10th century CE	
Peña, 1991	Early Muisca			
Peña, 1991	Late Muisca			
Langebaek, 1986	Herrera			
Langebaek, 1986	Muisca			
Langebaek, 1986	Modern			
Schrimpff, 1981	Herrera	400 BCE	200	
Schrimpff, 1981	Muisca	1400	1500	

=== Regional variations ===
==== Western slopes of the Eastern Ranges ====
Author	Name	Start age	End age	Notes
Argüello, 2004	Herrera	800 BCE	800	
Argüello, 2004	Pubenza	800	1000	
Argüello, 2004	Late Period	1000	1550	
Argüello, 2004	Modern	>1550		
Schrimpff, 1976	Period I	750	1200	
Schrimpff, 1976	Period II	1200	1550	

==== Boyacá ====
Author	Name	Start age	End age	Notes
Langebaek, 2001	Herrera	400 BCE	700	
Langebaek, 2001	Late Herrera	700	1000	
Langebaek, 2001	Early Muisca	1000	1200	
Langebaek, 2001	Late Muisca	1200	1600	
Langebaek, 2001	Modern	>1600		
Boada, 2007	Late Herrera	700	1000	
Boada, 2007	Early Muisca	1000	1300	
Boada, 2007	Late Muisca	1300	1600	

== See also ==
- Muisca Confederation
- Aguazuque, Lake Herrera, Tequendama
