= Zipaquirá Province =

Colombian province (1852–1855)

Coordinates: 4.95°N 74.03°W

The province within New Granada.

The Zipaquirá Province (Spanish: Provincia de Zipaquirá) was an administrative division of the Republic of New Granada. It was created on 6 May 1852 when the Bogotá Province was subdivided. The province existed until 24 May 1855, when its territory was reintegrated into the Bogotá Province.

== Geography ==
=== Physical appearance ===
The province was located in the northwest of the modern department of Cundinamarca, its territory corresponded approximately to provinces of Central Savanna and Rionegro. The territory was highly mountainous as the Cordillera Oriental traveled the province north to south, almost parallel to the main body of water in the region, the Bogotá River.

=== Territorial division ===
The province was divided into three cantons: Zipaquirá, Guatavita y La Palma. They were divided into parish districts and villages, as follows:

- Canton of Zipaquirá: Zipaquirá, Cajicá, Cogua, Cota, Chía, Gachancipá, Nemocón, Pacho, Sopó, Suesca, Tabio and Tocancipá.
- Canton of Guatavita: Guatavita, Gachetá, Gachalá, Guasca, Medina, Sesquilé, Upía and Cabuyaro.
- Canton of La Palma: La Palma, Caparrapí, Peña, Peñón, Topaipí and Yacopí.

=== Governors ===
Governor	Period
Juan Miguel Acevedo	1852–1852
Ramón Muñoz	1853–1853
Felipe Pérez	1853–1853
Salvador Camacho Roldán	1853–1853
Felipe Pérez	1853–1853
José María Coronado	1854–1854
Valentín Gálvez	1854–1854
Eusebio Bernal	1854–1854
Torcuato Vargas	1854–1854
Celestino Durán	1854–1854
José María Coronado	1855–1855
Rafael de Urbina	1855–1855
Valentín Gálvez	1855–1855

== See also ==
- Provinces of the Republic of New Granada
