= Tenjo =

- Municipality and town
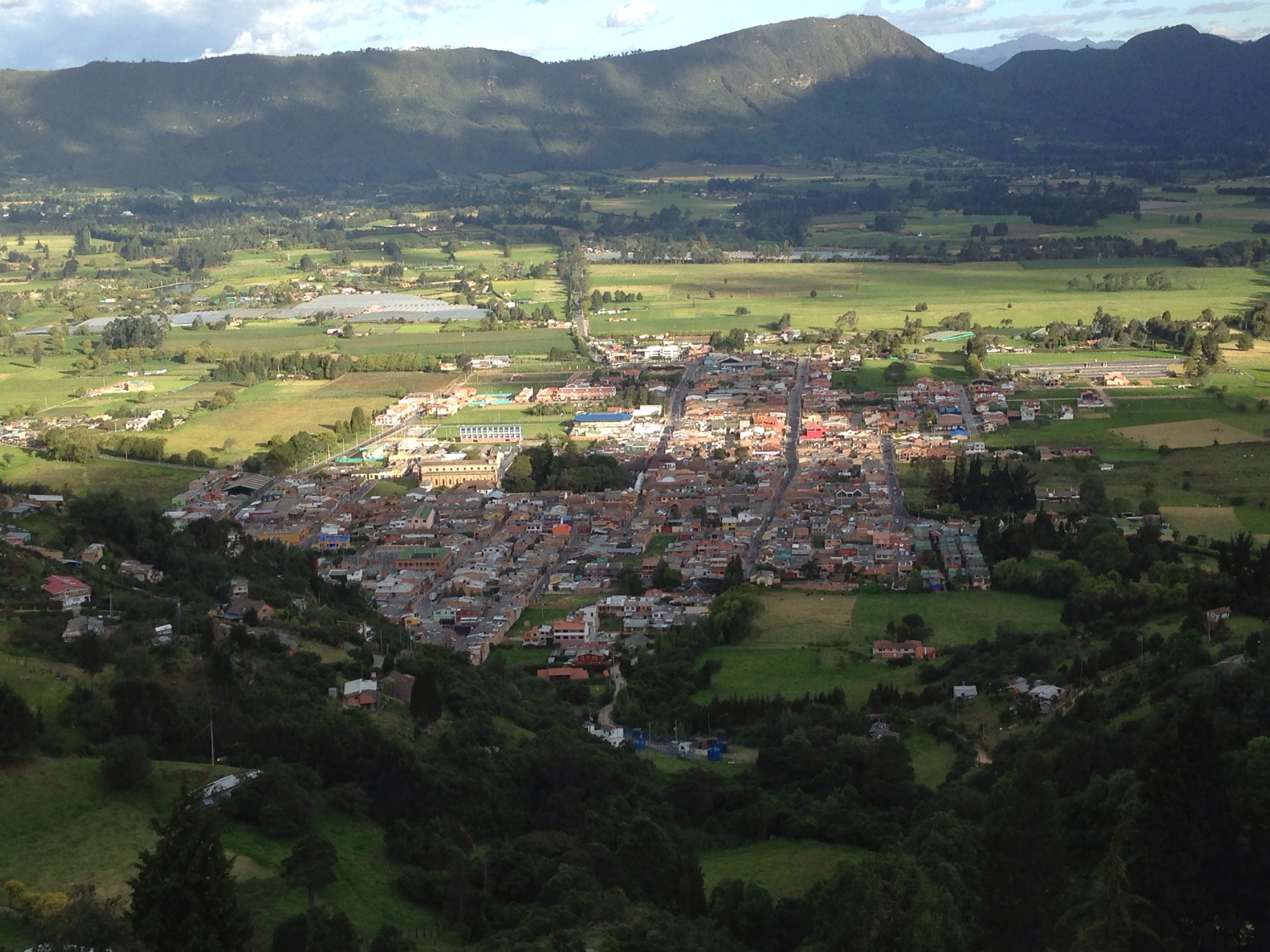
- View of Tenjo

- Flag Coat of arms

- Location of the town and municipality of Tenjo in Cundinamarca Department

- Location in Colombia
- Coordinates: 4°55′N 74°10′W
- Country: Colombia
- Department: Cundinamarca
- Province: Central Savanna Province
- Founded: 8 April 1603
- Founder: Diego Gómez de Mena

Government
  - Mayor: Ivan David Nemocon Espinosa (2023-2027)

Area
  - Municipality and town: 108 km^{2} (42 sq mi)
  - Urban: 2 km^{2} (0.77 sq mi)
- Elevation: 2,587 m (8,488 ft)

Population (2015)
  - Municipality and town: 18,387
  - Density: 170/km^{2} (441/sq mi)
  - Urban: 10,915
- Time zone: UTC-5 (Colombia Standard Time)
- Website: Official website

Tenjo is a municipality and town of Colombia in the Central Savanna Province, part of the department of Cundinamarca. The urban centre is located at an altitude of 2,587 metres (8,488 ft) on the Bogotá savanna. Tenjo is part of the Metropolitan Area of Bogotá and borders Chía, Madrid, Tabio, Funza, Subachoque and Cota.

== Etymology ==
Tenjo in Muisca language literally translates "in the big mouth".

== History ==
The area of Tenjo was inhabited by the Muisca in the times before the Spanish conquest. Tenjo was ruled by the zipa based in Bacatá. Ancient rock art has been discovered in Tenjo.

Modern Tenjo was founded on April 8, 1603, by Diego Gómez de Mena. On the 7 of May, 1637, it was decided that the first church of the town was to be built by Alonso Serrano Hernández after being hired by Juan de Vera, Cristóbal Gómez de Silva, Juan de Orejuela and Juan de Artieda. The church was completed on August 17, 1645. By the year of 1778, there was a population of 1,009 people and 211 families, excluding 983 other native people who inhabited Tenjo.

== Economy ==
Tenjo's economy is mainly based on horticulture and livestock-breeding. Thanks to its relatively close position to Bogotá, Tenjo is starting to become part of its suburbs and with many schools being established here that have collaborated with this effect.

== Sister cities ==
- Spain: Las Gabias

== Born in Tenjo ==
- Crisanto Luque Sánchez (1889–1959), cardinal of the Roman Catholic Church

== Climate ==
Climate data for Tenjo (Providencia Gja), elevation 2,560 m (8,400 ft), (1981–2010)
Month	Jan	Feb	Mar	Apr	May	Jun	Jul	Aug	Sep	Oct	Nov	Dec	Year
Mean daily maximum °C (°F)	20.1 (68.2)	20.3 (68.5)	20.0 (68.0)	19.7 (67.5)	19.3 (66.7)	18.9 (66.0)	18.6 (65.5)	18.7 (65.7)	19.2 (66.6)	19.3 (66.7)	19.3 (66.7)	19.7 (67.5)	19.4 (66.9)
Daily mean °C (°F)	13.3 (55.9)	13.7 (56.7)	13.9 (57.0)	14.2 (57.6)	14.2 (57.6)	13.9 (57.0)	13.6 (56.5)	13.6 (56.5)	13.6 (56.5)	13.7 (56.7)	13.8 (56.8)	13.5 (56.3)	13.7 (56.7)
Mean daily minimum °C (°F)	4.6 (40.3)	5.7 (42.3)	6.7 (44.1)	8.1 (46.6)	8.2 (46.8)	7.6 (45.7)	6.9 (44.4)	6.7 (44.1)	6.2 (43.2)	7.0 (44.6)	7.1 (44.8)	5.7 (42.3)	6.7 (44.1)
Average precipitation mm (inches)	28.5 (1.12)	45.1 (1.78)	74.9 (2.95)	99.9 (3.93)	98.5 (3.88)	70.1 (2.76)	54.2 (2.13)	47.5 (1.87)	65.5 (2.58)	100.0 (3.94)	80.5 (3.17)	55.4 (2.18)	820.1 (32.29)
Average precipitation days	8	10	14	17	18	17	17	16	15	17	16	11	177
Average relative humidity (%)	79	79	81	82	82	80	78	78	79	82	82	81	80
Source: Instituto de Hidrologia Meteorologia y Estudios Ambientales

== Gallery ==
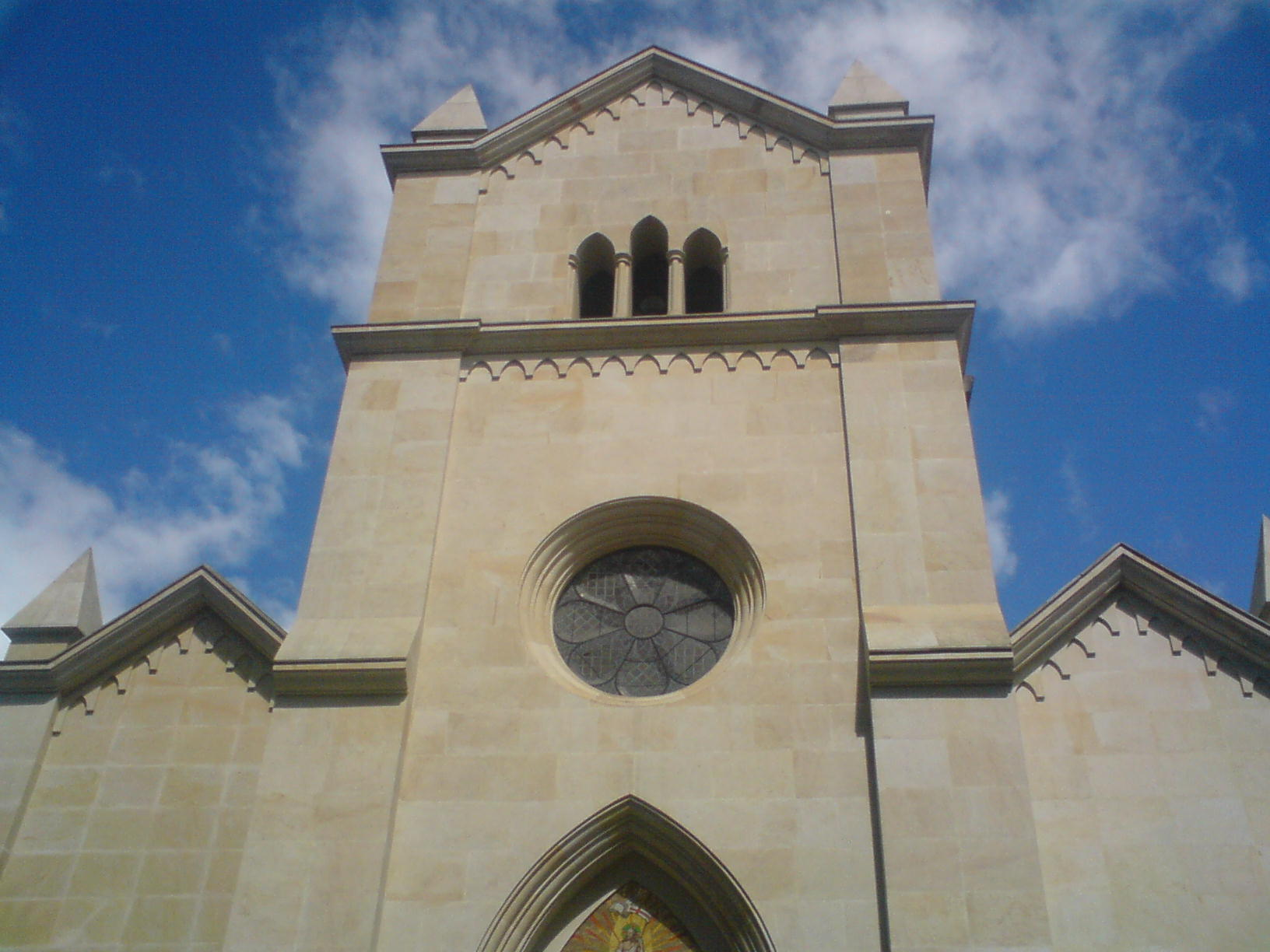
Church of Tenjo

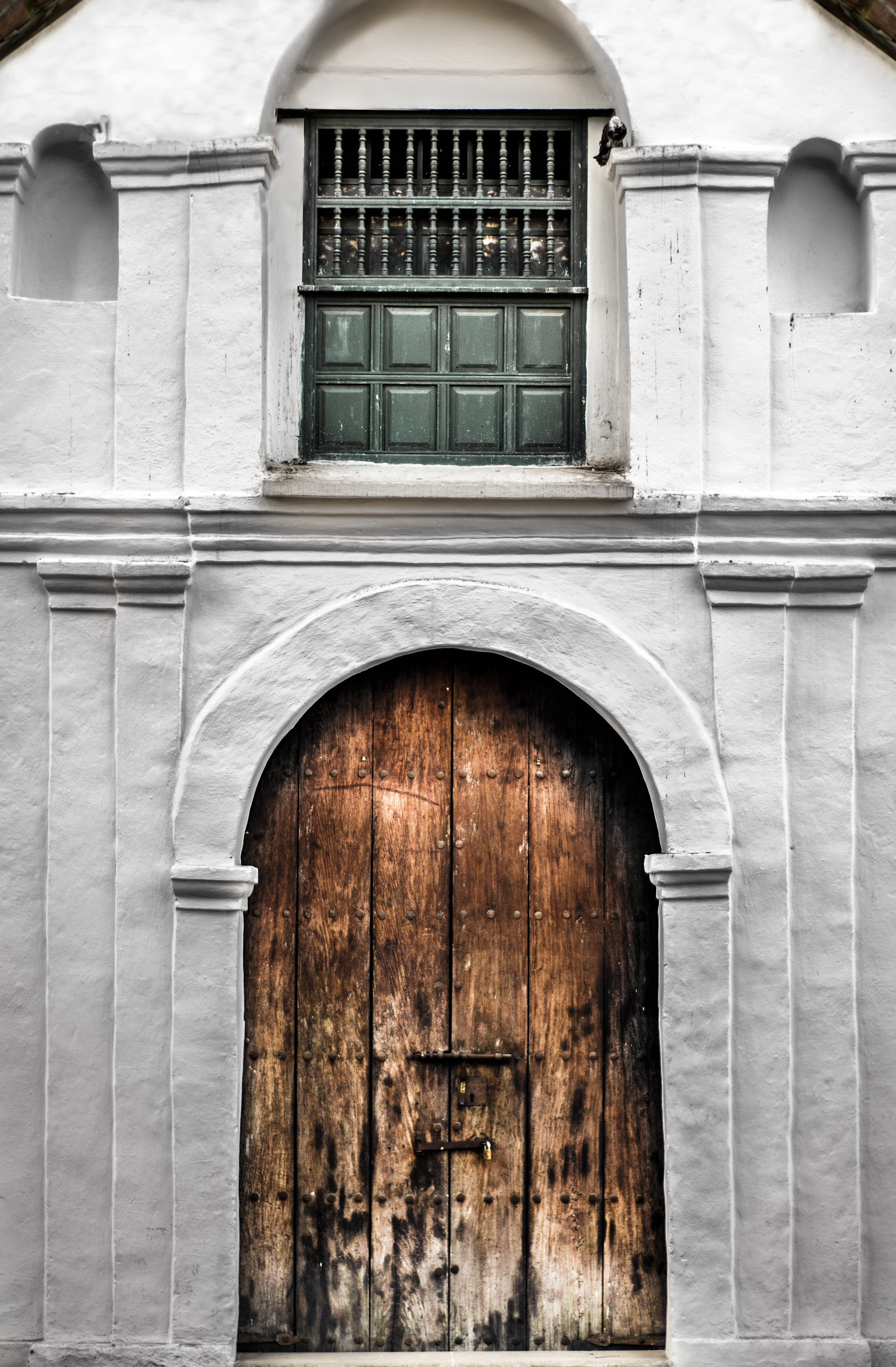
Chapel in Tenjo

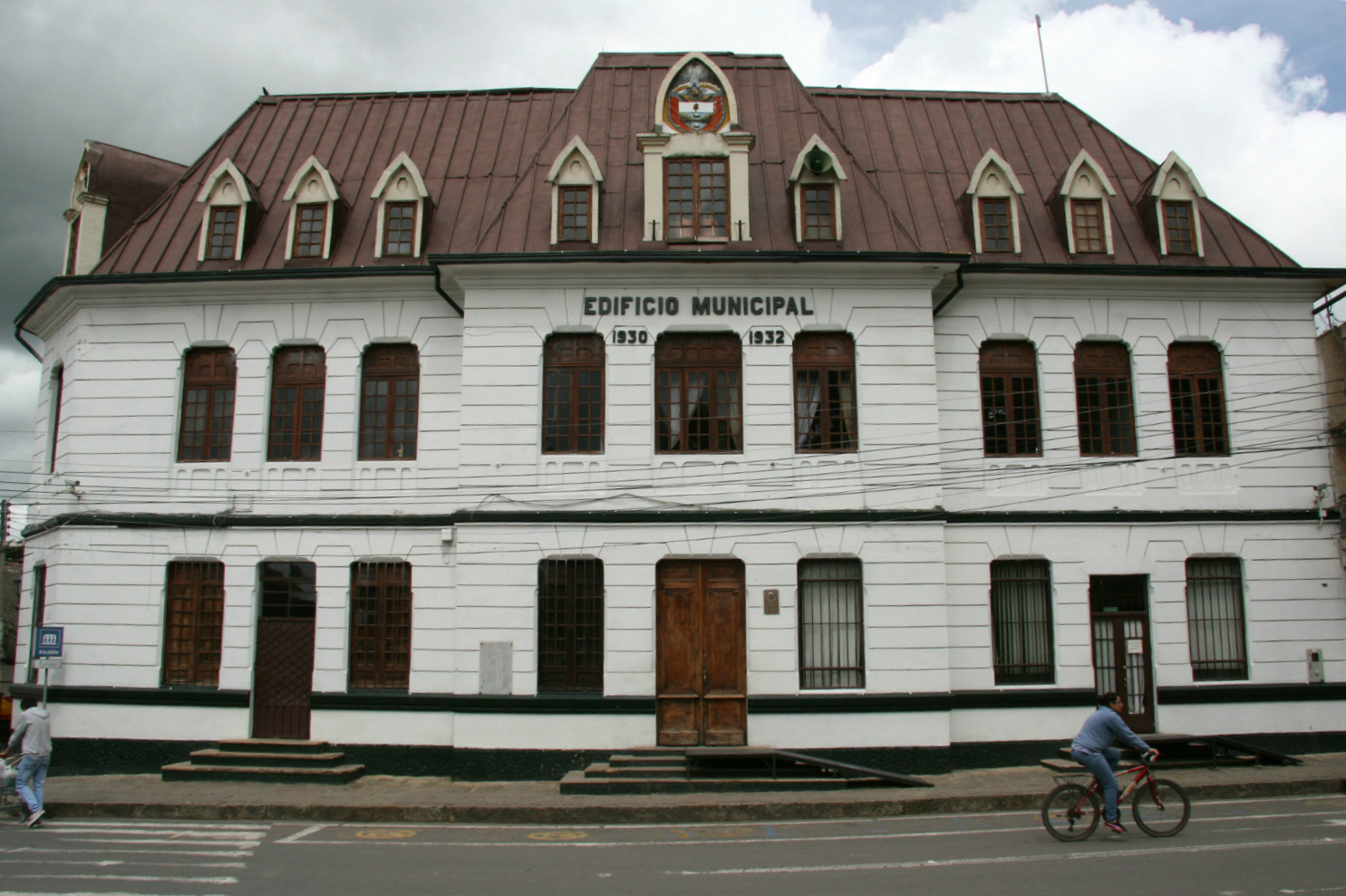
City council

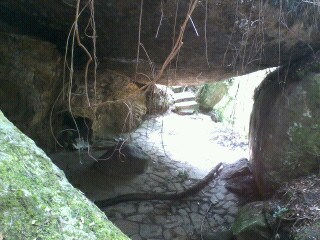
Cave in Tenjo

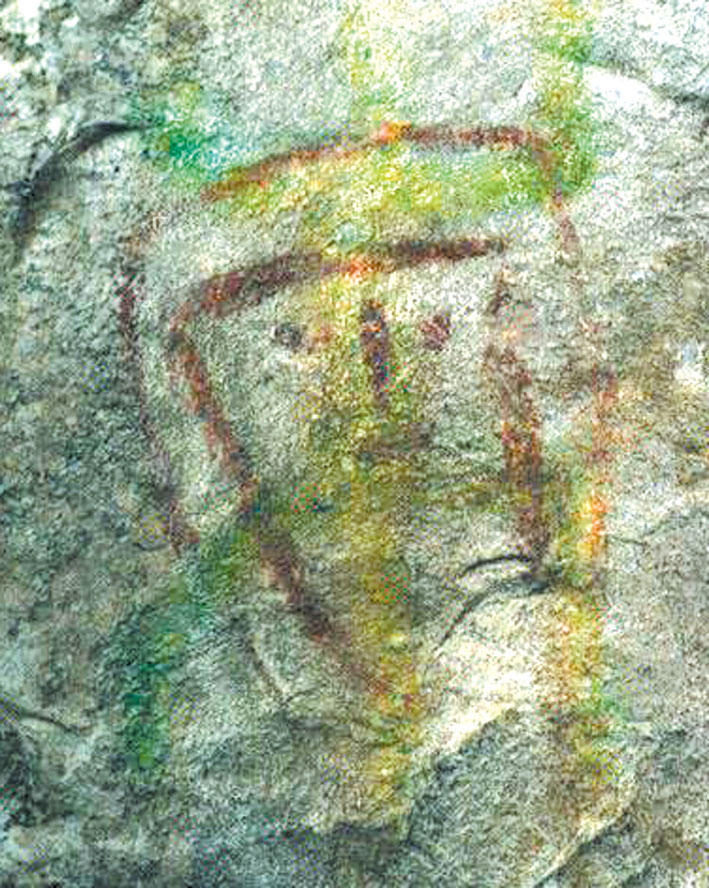
Rock art in Tenjo
