= Zipaquirá =

- Municipality and city
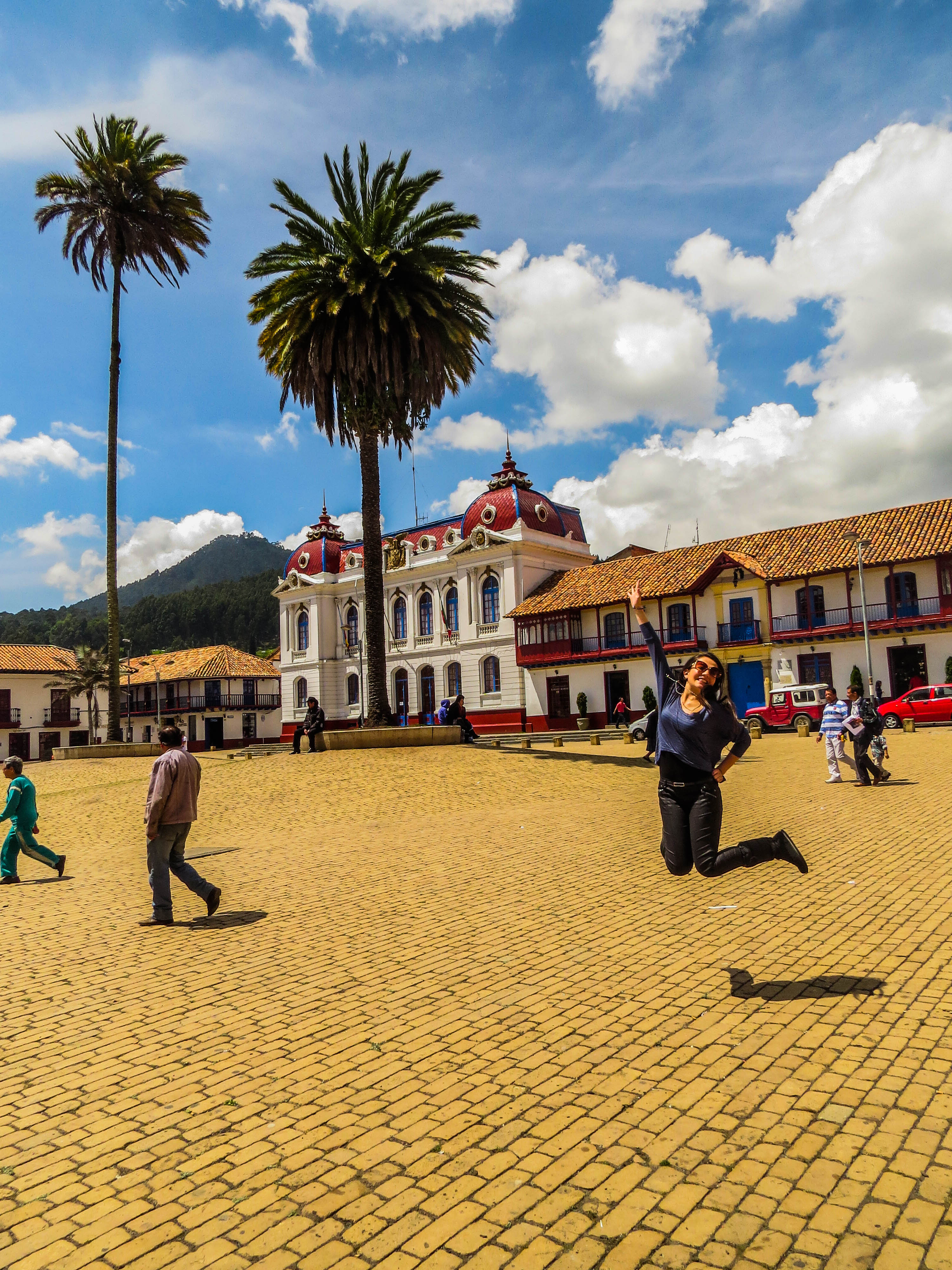
- Central square of Zipaquirá

- Flag Coat of arms

- Location of the town and municipality of Zipaquirá in Cundinamarca

- Location in Colombia
- Coordinates: 5°02′00″N 74°00′00″W
- Country: Colombia
- Departamento: Cundinamarca
- Province: Central Savanna Province
- Founded: 18 July 1600
- Founder: Luis Henríquez

Government
  - Mayor: Fabián Rojas (2024-2027)

Area
  - Municipality and city: 194.8 km^{2} (75.2 sq mi)
  - Urban: 10.25 km^{2} (3.96 sq mi)
- Elevation: 2,650 m (8,690 ft)

Population (2023)
  - Municipality and city: 131,900
  - Rank: 47th in Colombia
  - Density: 677.1/km^{2} (1,754/sq mi)
  - Urban: 137,580
  - Urban density: 13,420/km^{2} (34,760/sq mi)
- Demonym: Zipaquireño/a
- Time zone: UTC-5
- Area code: +1
- Website: Official website

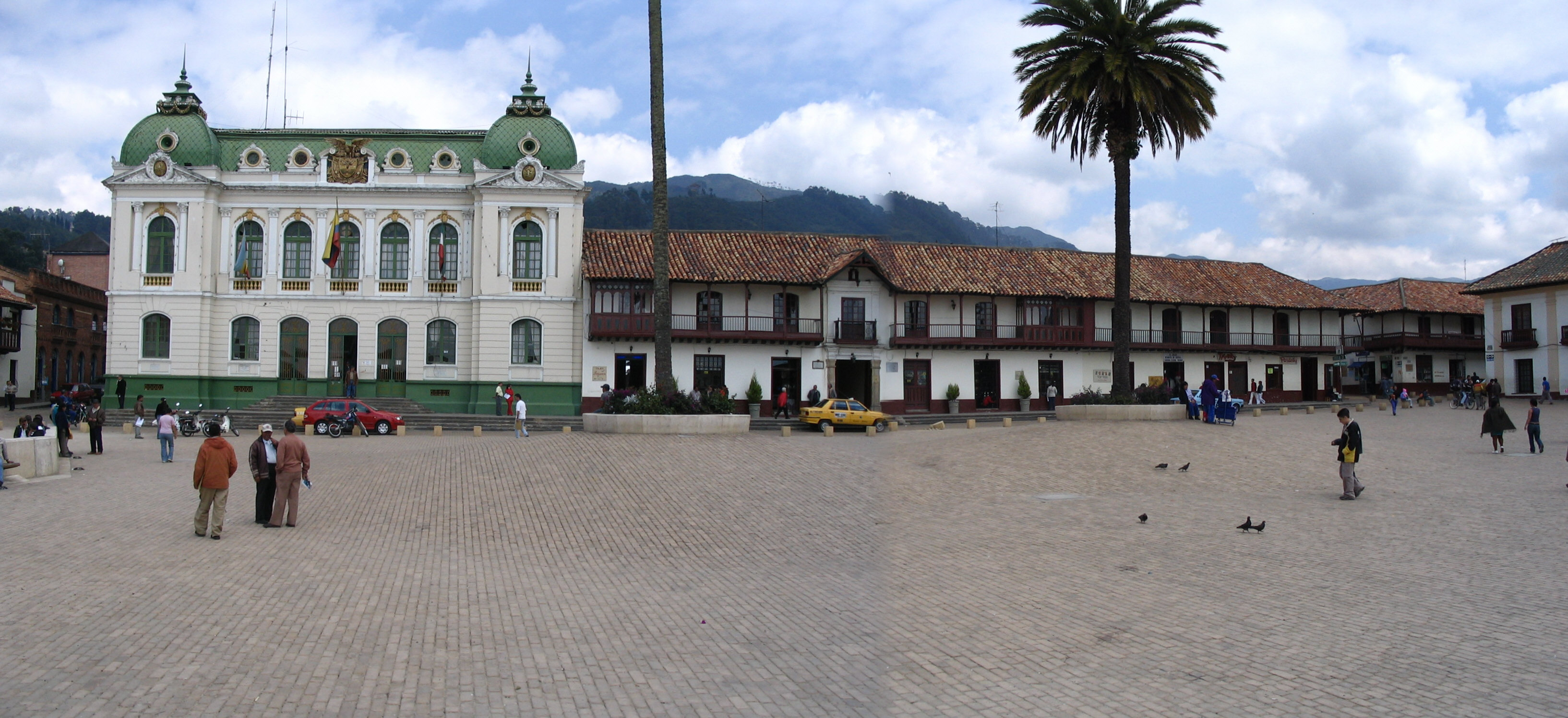
Main square of Zipaquirá

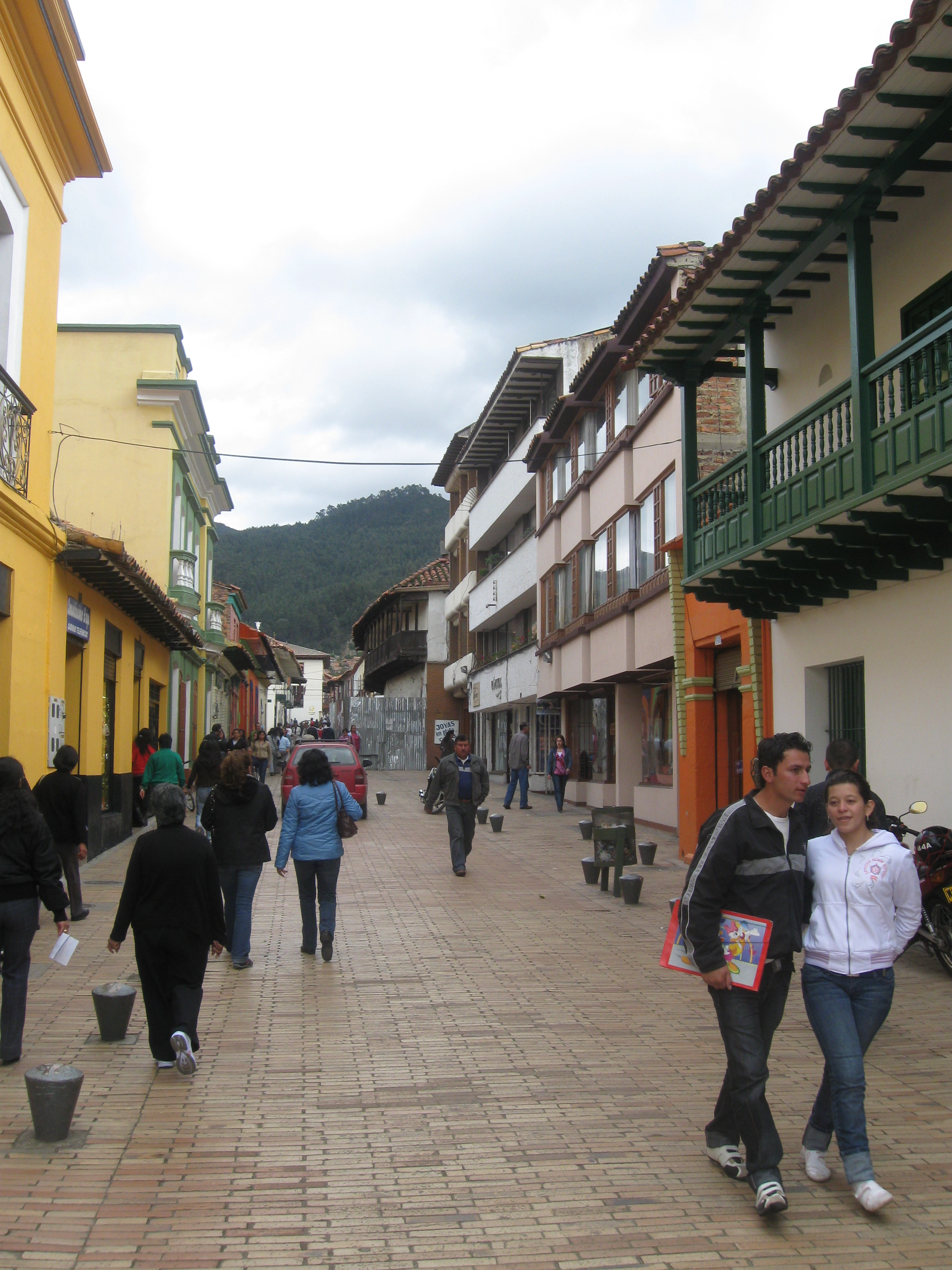
Typical street of Zipaquirá

Zipaquirá (Spanish pronunciation: [sipakiˈɾa]) is a municipality and city of Colombia in the department of Cundinamarca. Its neighboring municipalities are Cogua and Nemocón to the north; Tabio, Cajicá and Sopó to the south, Tocancipá and Gachancipá to the east and Pacho and Subachoque to the west.

Its seat of municipal government is 49 kilometers from the national capital Bogotá. It is part of the Greater Bogotá Metropolitan Area, and is the capital of the Sabana Centro province. It is also the headquarters of the diocese of the same name and that includes much of the Department of Cundinamarca, extending to the centre of Bogotá, the region of Rionegro, the Ubaté Valley, and the region of Guavio.

The city is primarily known for its Salt Cathedral, an underground church built inside a salt mine in a tunnel made as result of the excavation of the salinas. Zipaquirá has historic architecture, and the old city centre is a tourist attraction. Its main square is surrounded by old buildings in the Spanish Colonial style. This small city can be reached by train from Bogotá.

== Etymology ==
In Chibcha, the language of the Muisca, who inhabited the Altiplano Cundiboyacense before the Spanish conquest, the name means "The Land of the zipa". Zipa was the ruler of this territory. Another origin is "City of our father".

== History ==
=== Pre-Spanish colonization ===
In the Abra Valley between Zipaquirá and Tocancipá were found some of the most ancient human remains of South America. The lithic strata reveal animal bones and carbon fragments, analysed with carbon 14 dating to be around 12,500 years old, which makes it the oldest evidence of human settlement on the Altiplano Cundiboyacense.

There are two possible origins of its name. One of them is taken from the indigenous people who inhabited the foot of the Zippa mountain range, "Chicaquicha", which means "our large wall" or according to other sources, "city of our father", and until the 19th century the name was written beginning with the letter C. The other possibility refers to the name "zipa", a title conferred to the governor of the village and to his wife, the latter known by the title of "Quira", and thus "Zipa-Quirá". The native people who lived there settled in the upper part of the mine called "Puebla Viejo", now known as Santiago Pérez, approximately 200 meters above the present site of the city, and where early Spanish descriptions (1537) speak of "seeing a few hundred dwellings with a population of 12,000 people".

These lands were part of the domain of the zipa of Bacatá, the leader of the southern part of the Muisca. This area of the Bogotá plain had at that time a series of small lakes and canyons which made possible the transportation of its inhabitants by canoe, by means of which the inhabitants of Nemocón, Gachancipá, and Tocancipá reached Chicaquicha in order to seek supplies of salt which they traded for pottery and tiles. Salt was also traded with peoples throughout the Andean region of Colombia, including the Panche, and Pantágora in the present department of Tolima, and the Muzo of the present-day department of Boyacá.

=== New Kingdom of Granada ===
On July 18, 1600, Don oidor Luis Henríquez established a settlement on the site with workers and their families, and named it the "Village of Zipaquirá".

On August 2, 1600, Henríquez contracted Juan de Robles to construct the Church of Zipaquirá, which was later reconstructed by Pedro de Tovar y Buendía, when the parish priest was Fernando de Buenaventura y Castillo.

In 1605 the area was named the Corregimiento de Zipaquirá and removed to its original location; this was done due to the limited area available on the originally occupied plain, as well as to the fact that the Spanish forces ordered that no Spanish, negros, mestizos or mulattos were permitted to live in native villages, even if they had purchased land therein.

In 1623, the Spanish official Don Francisco de Sosa named as wards the 321 native inhabitants in the "Old Town", according to the declaration of Alfredo Tinoco.

On October 5, 1638, Gabriel de Carvajal became the guardian of 771 natives in the region and 125 in Tibitó.

In 1778, by order of the Viceroy Manuel Antonio Flórez, the natives who lived in Zipaquirá were transported to Nemocón in order to prevent constant rebellions of previous owners of the salt deposits.

On August 3, 1779, Zipaquirá saw the creation of the Holy Trinity and San Antonio de Padua parish.

In 1852, Zipaquirá became a province, retaining the status until 1855.

During the Spanish reconquest, on August 3, 1816, the so-called Zipaquirá Martyrs were executed in the city square.

=== Republican era ===
With the Constitution of Cundinamarca of 1815, the city became the capital of the province of the same name. On July 10, 1863, it was designated the capital of the Sovereign State of Cundinamarca, although subsequently it was named Funza by decree of president Morales. Law number 46 of April 29, 1905, created the Department of Quesada, the capital of which was Zipaquirá, which remained so until 1910.

== Geography and description ==
Zipaquirá is located 48 kilometres (30 mi) north of Bogotá, linked by road and by train. The most famous of its salt mines has been exploited since pre-Columbian times by the Muisca, in which is located the famous Salt Cathedral. González Forero Square is the center of the city, surrounded by buildings that have conserved their colonial style and are considered to be national monuments. The square contains a cathedral constructed between 1760 and 1870, with its stone façade, as well as the city hall and the Salinas administration building, with their green republican-style roofs.

The city has undergone recent changes, having transformed streets in the center to pedestrian walkways, limiting vehicle traffic in the area in an attempt at preservation and conservation, and lending a more cordial aspect for tourists. As part of this strategy, the city has also carried out a project of restructuring the Sabana Station (railroad), and, next to it, the construction of Parque La Esperanza.

Currently, the Bogotá - Chía - Cajicá - Zipaquirá highway is completed, making possible more rapid and safer access to the city, since the Cajicá - Zipaquirá segment was one of the most accident-prone roads in the country.

Zipaquirá offers restaurants, colonial housing, tourist agencies, recreation centers such as Panaca Sabana, museums, crafts, and retail infrastructure.

Agriculture is also important in the municipality, especially dairy and potato farming. Industry in the region is closely associated with the production, processing, and refining of salt. The estimated population is 130,000 inhabitants (called "Zipaquireños").

The streets, the park, the houses, and the square commemorate the era of the colony. As well as the communal movement and the indigenous struggles that gave way to a new chapter in the history of the country. Today through tourist guides and locals the indigenous origins of the municipality, which in the indigenous language is called Chicaquicha, is visited by a large number of tourists from around the world.

Among the most famous events of the area are the majestic Holy Week processions, organized for the last 54 years by the Nazarene of Zipaquirá Congregation, with processions throughout the week with beautiful Spanish religious relics that attract both local residents and visitors. Tourists actively participate during Good Friday when the procession of the Path of the Cross journeys up to the Plazoleta del Minero to the entrance of the Salt Cathedral.

== Climate ==
Climate data for Zipaquirá/Nemocón (Checua-Nemocon), elevation 2,580 m (8,460 ft), (1981–2010)
Month	Jan	Feb	Mar	Apr	May	Jun	Jul	Aug	Sep	Oct	Nov	Dec	Year
Mean daily maximum °C (°F)	20.6 (69.1)	20.2 (68.4)	20.8 (69.4)	19.7 (67.5)	18.9 (66.0)	17.9 (64.2)	17.9 (64.2)	18.5 (65.3)	19.2 (66.6)	19.9 (67.8)	20.4 (68.7)	20.5 (68.9)	19.5 (67.1)
Daily mean °C (°F)	13.8 (56.8)	14.0 (57.2)	14.4 (57.9)	14.4 (57.9)	14.2 (57.6)	13.6 (56.5)	13.6 (56.5)	13.6 (56.5)	13.9 (57.0)	14.1 (57.4)	14.6 (58.3)	14.1 (57.4)	14.0 (57.2)
Mean daily minimum °C (°F)	7.1 (44.8)	8.1 (46.6)	8.7 (47.7)	10.1 (50.2)	10.5 (50.9)	9.8 (49.6)	10.0 (50.0)	9.5 (49.1)	9.1 (48.4)	9.5 (49.1)	9.8 (49.6)	8.0 (46.4)	9.1 (48.4)
Average precipitation mm (inches)	23.7 (0.93)	53.0 (2.09)	69.8 (2.75)	78.9 (3.11)	67.3 (2.65)	34.6 (1.36)	37.0 (1.46)	37.5 (1.48)	59.1 (2.33)	74.8 (2.94)	61.0 (2.40)	31.5 (1.24)	628.1 (24.73)
Average precipitation days	4	7	9	12	14	12	15	15	11	12	11	7	125
Average relative humidity (%)	73	73	74	79	80	81	80	79	77	79	79	76	78
Mean monthly sunshine hours	195.3	144.0	158.1	123.0	127.1	99.0	139.5	124.0	141.0	136.4	135.0	167.4	1,689.8
Mean daily sunshine hours	6.3	5.1	5.1	4.1	4.1	3.3	4.5	4.0	4.7	4.4	4.5	5.4	4.6
Source: Instituto de Hidrologia Meteorologia y Estudios Ambientales

== Born in Zipaquirá ==
- Germán Castro Caycedo (1940–2021), journalist and writer
- Efraín Forero (1930–2022), cyclist; winner of Vuelta a Colombia
- Santiago Pérez (1830–1900), president of Colombia from 1874 to 1876
- Brandon Rivera (1996–), cyclist; currently riding for UCI World Tour team INEOS Grenadiers
- Omar Fernández (1993-), professional football player; currently in Club Leon
- Wilson Peña (1998-), cyclist

=== Raised in Zipaquirá ===
- Egan Bernal (born in Bogotá, 1997–), cyclist; winner of 2019 Tour de France
- Gustavo Petro Urrego (1960–), member of the political arm of M-19, former congressman and senator; mayor of Bogotá (2012-2015); president of Colombia (2022-2026)
- Gabriel García Márquez (1927–2014), writer and Nobel laureate

== Gallery ==
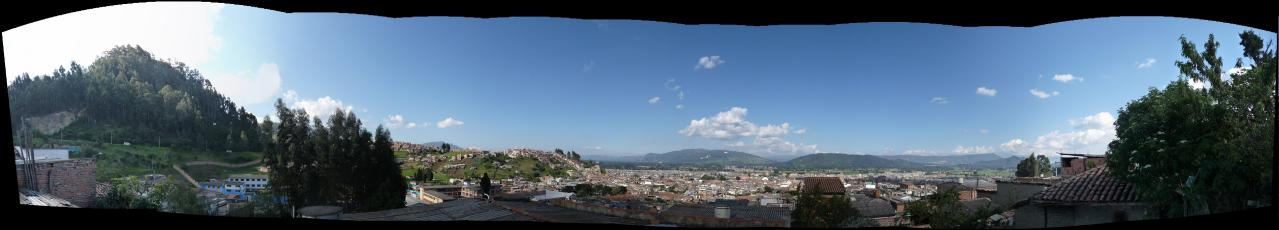
Panorama of Zipaquirá
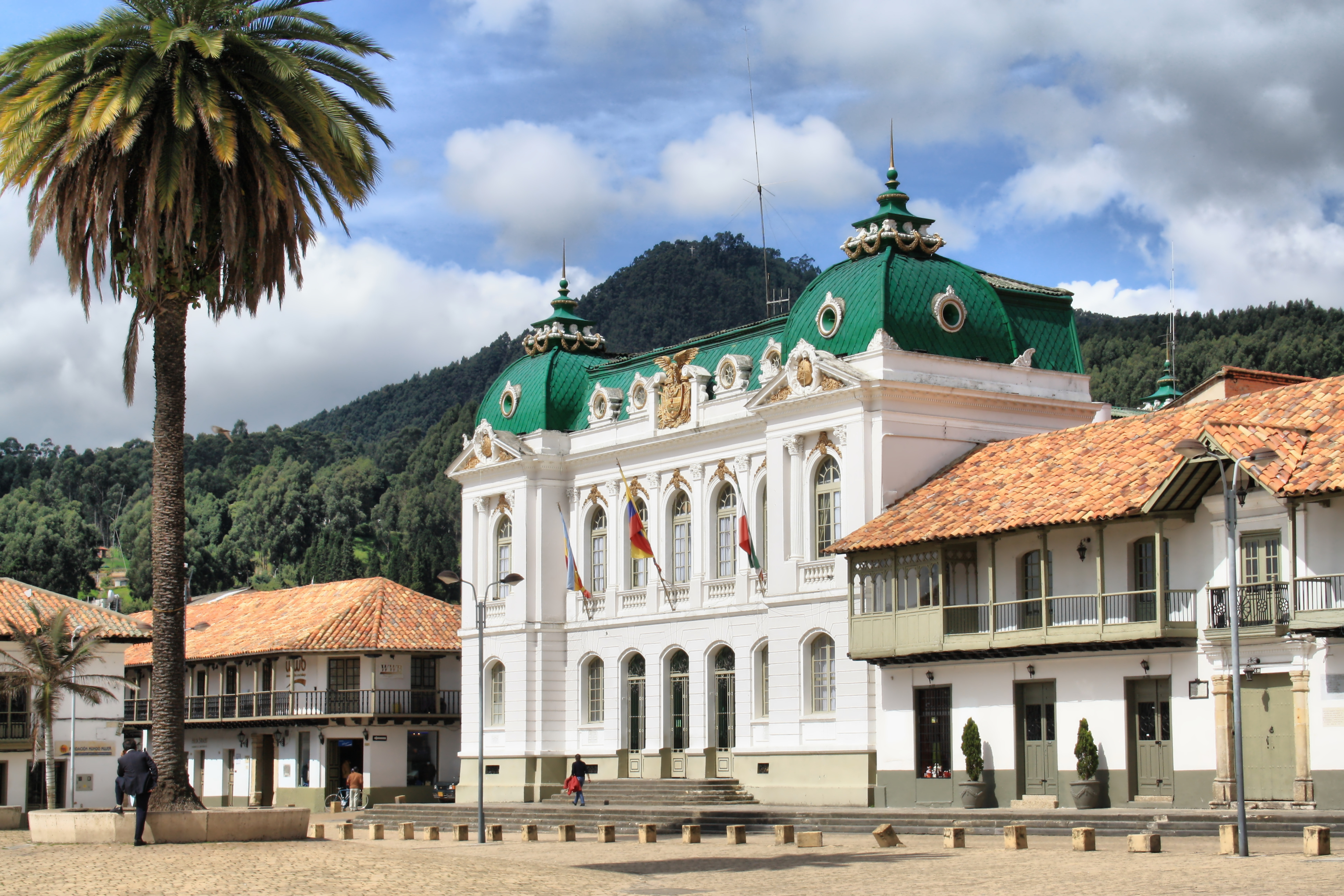
Central square

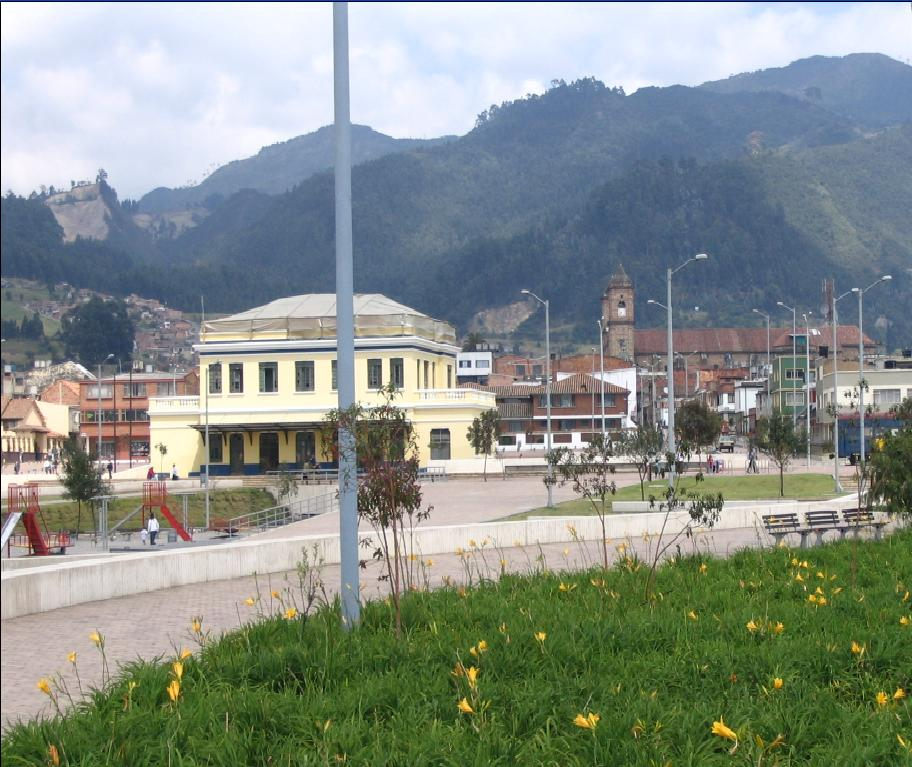
Train station

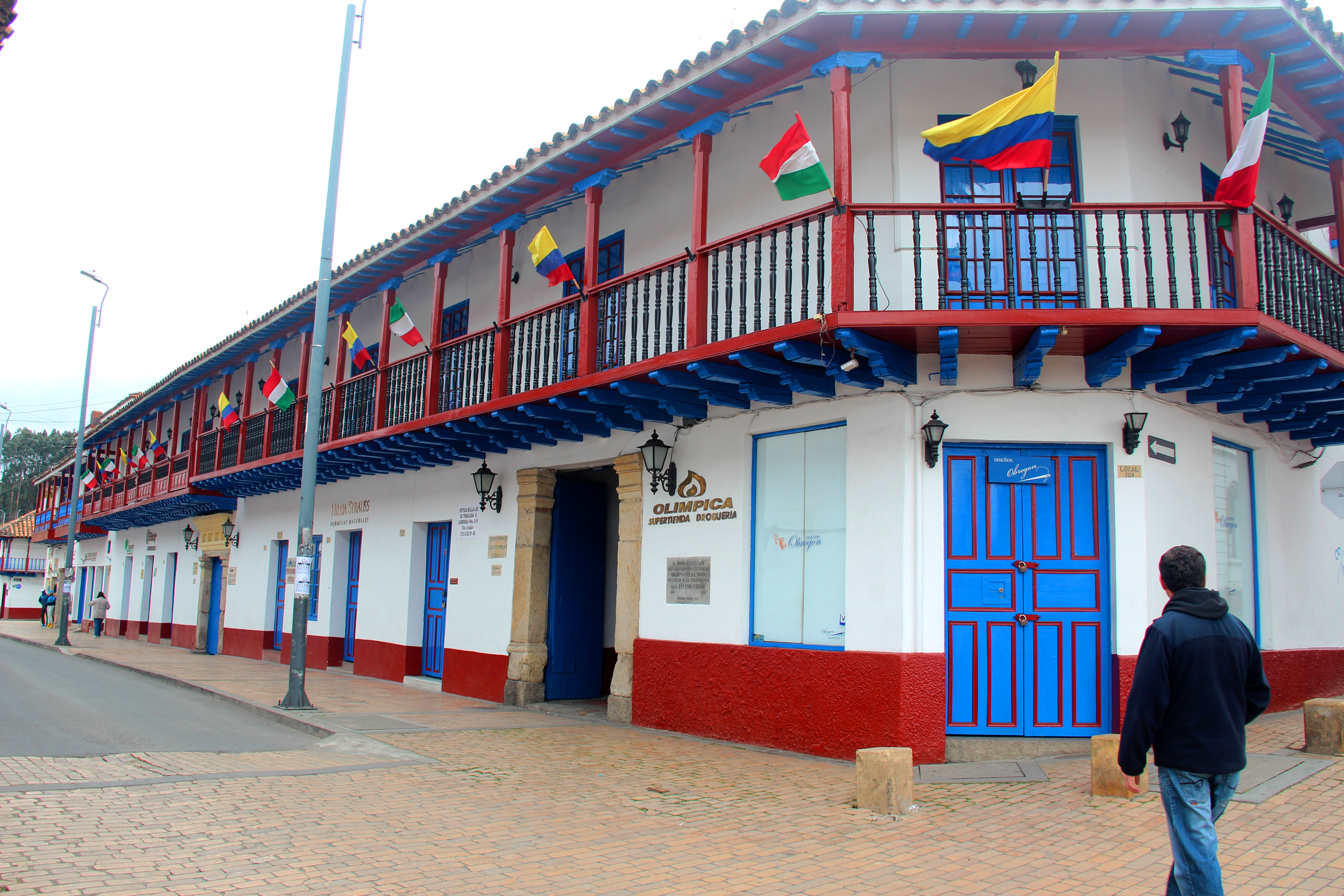
Colonial building

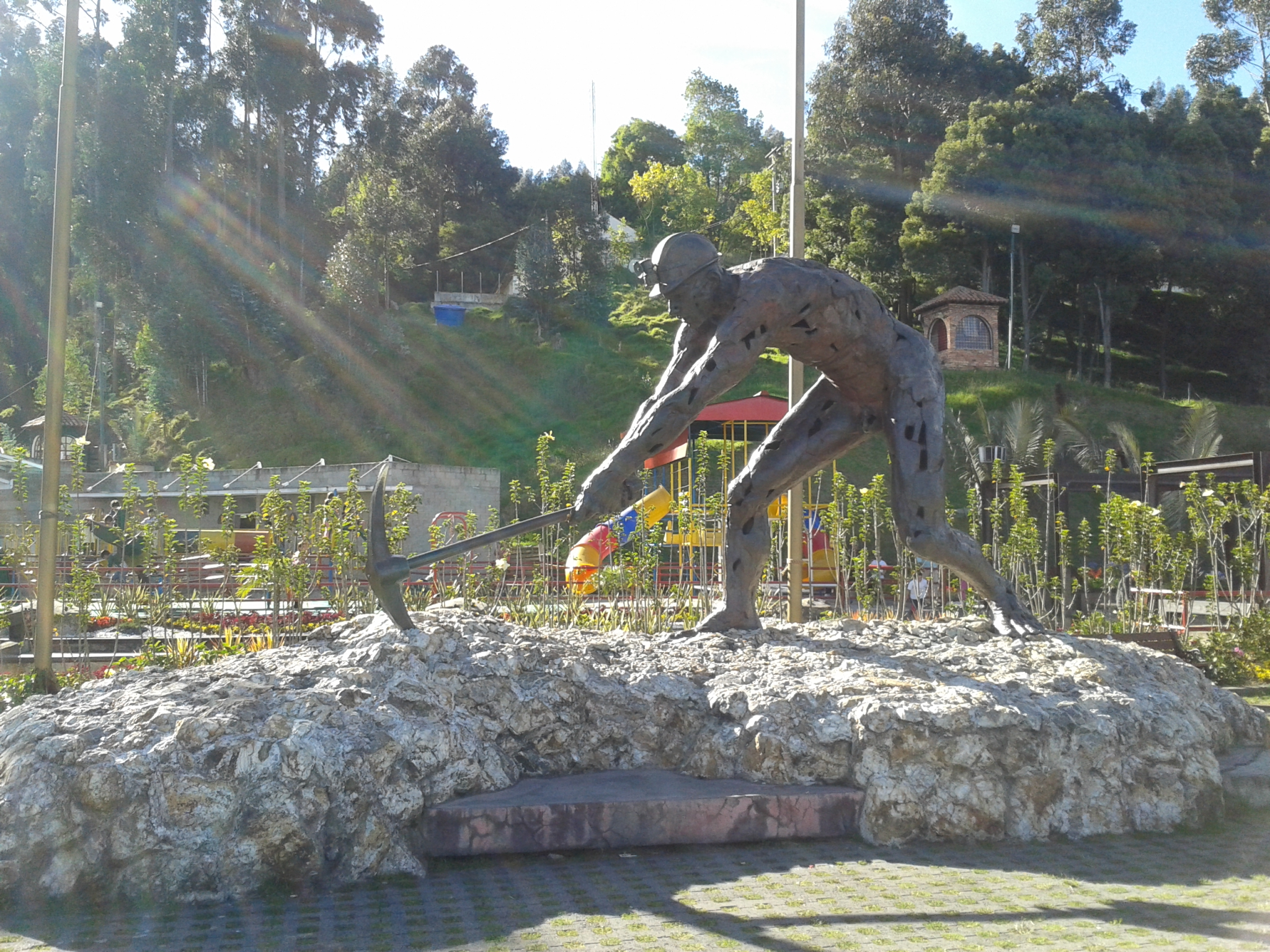
Monument to the salt miners

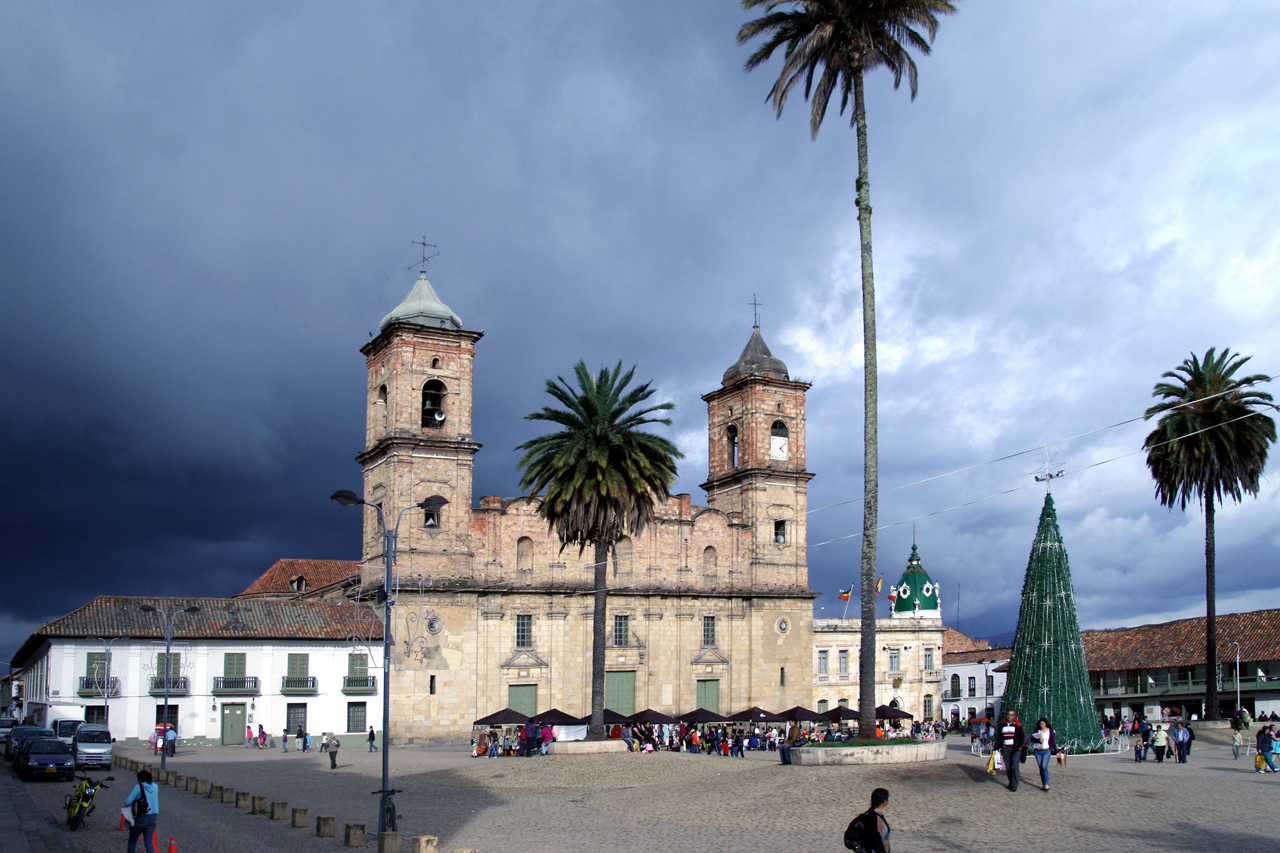
Cathedral

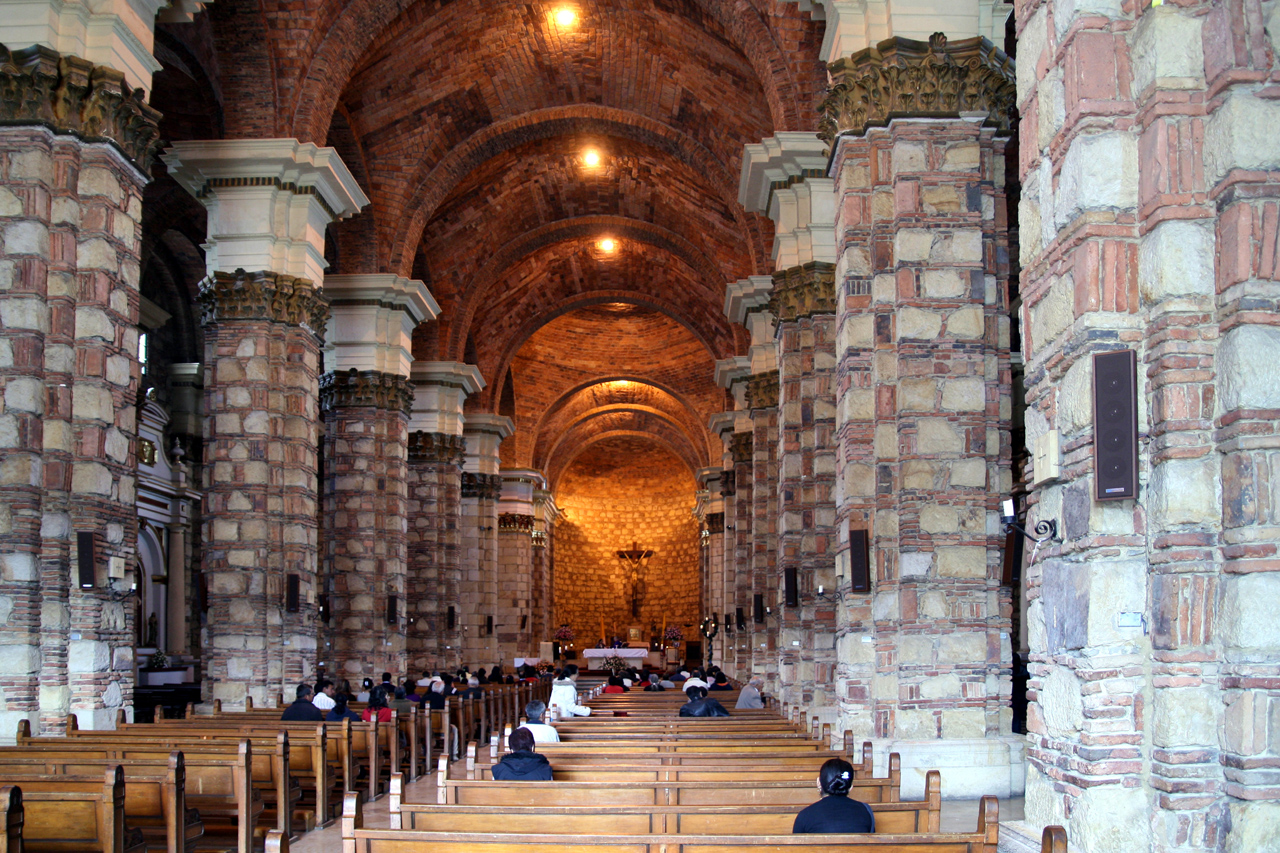
Cathedral interior

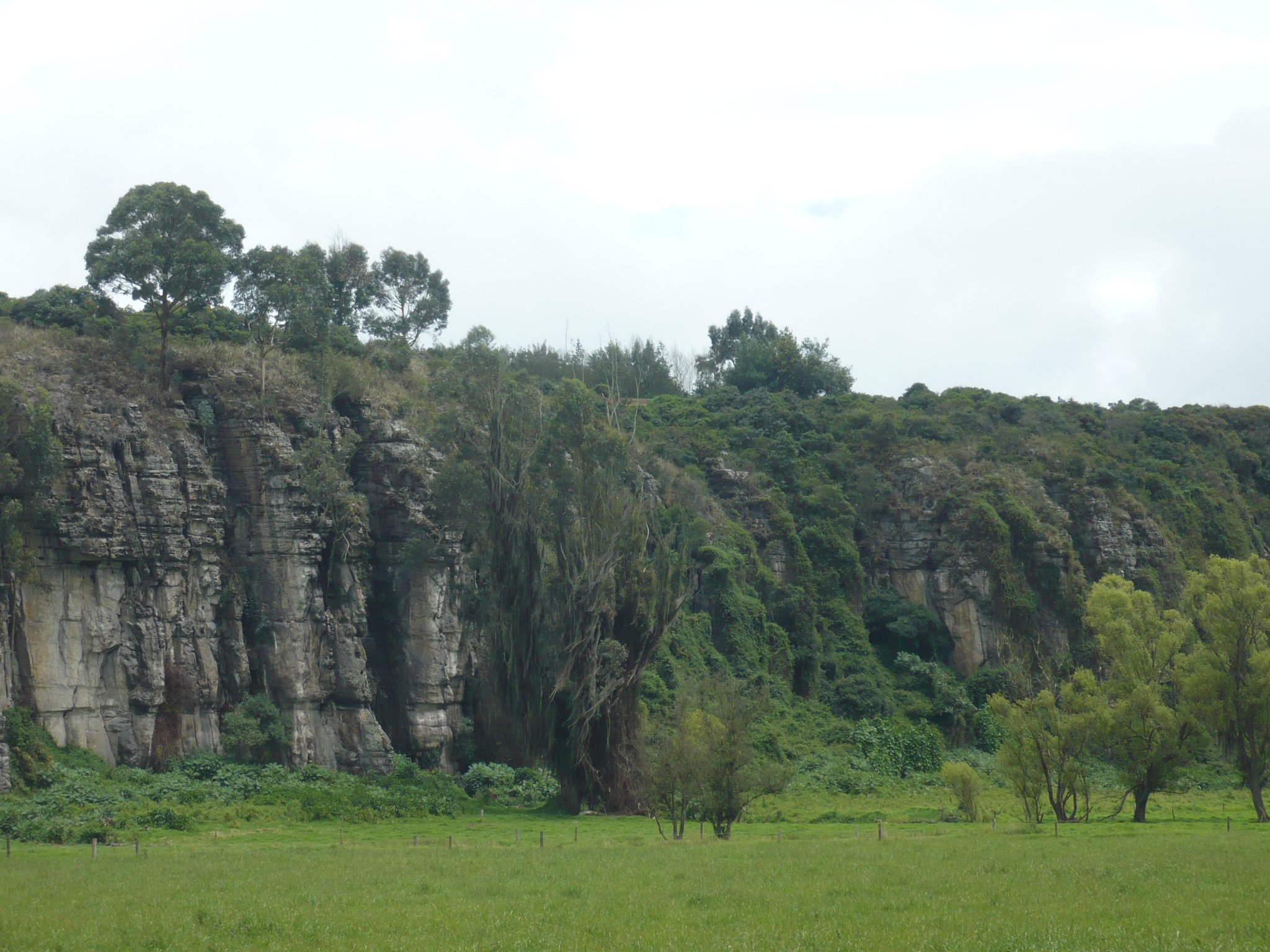
El Abra archaeological site

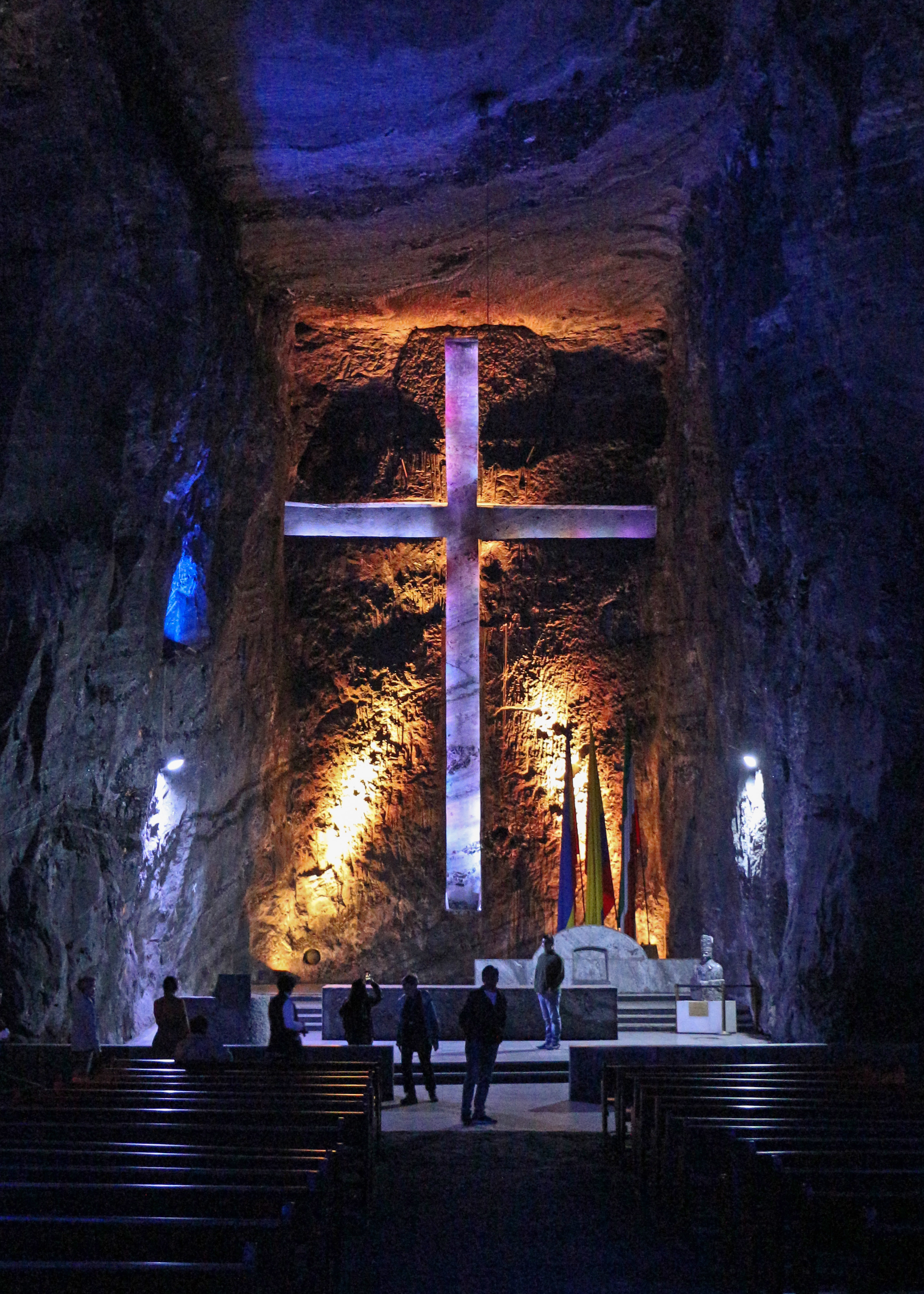
Salt Cathedral

== See also ==
- Muisca economy
- Nemocón, Salt Cathedral of Zipaquirá
- Cathedral of the Most Holy Trinity, Saint Anthony of Padua and Our Lady of Assumption of Zipaquirá
