= Nemocón =

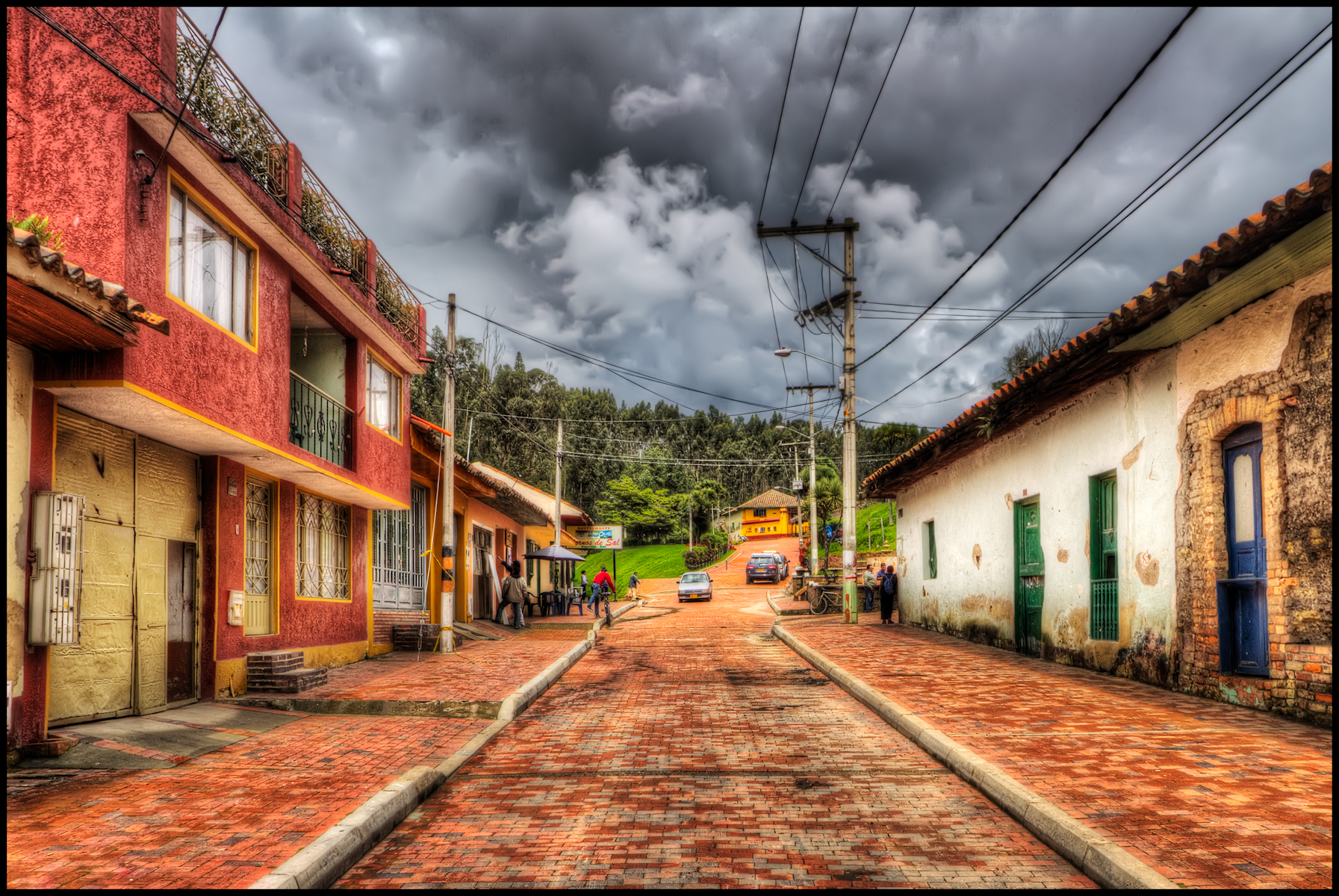
- Street in Nemocón

- Flag Coat of arms

- Location of the town and municipality of Nemocón in the Cundinamarca Department

- Location in Colombia
- Coordinates: 5°3′19″N 74°1′17″W
- Country: Colombia
- Departamento: Cundinamarca
- Province: Central Savanna Province
- Founded: 26 July 1600
- Founder: Luis Henríquez

Government
  - Mayor: Julián Alfredo Rodríguez Montaño (2020-2023)

Area
  - City: 98.1 km^{2} (37.9 sq mi)
  - Urban: 0.61 km^{2} (0.24 sq mi)
- Elevation: 2,585 m (8,481 ft)

Population (2015)
  - City: 13,488
  - Density: 137/km^{2} (356/sq mi)
  - Urban: 5,684
- Demonym: Nemoconense
- Time zone: UTC-5 (Colombia Standard Time)
- Area code: +1
- Website: Official website

Nemocón is a municipality and town of Colombia in the Central Savanna Province, part of the department of Cundinamarca. Nemocón, famous for its salt mine, was an important village in the Muisca Confederation, the country in the central Colombian Andes before the arrival of the Spanish.

The municipality is situated in the northern part of the Bogotá savanna, part of the Altiplano Cundiboyacense with its urban centre at an altitude of 2,585 metres (8,481 ft) and 65 kilometres (40 mi) from the capital Bogotá. Nemocón is the northeasternmost municipality of the Metropolitan Area of Bogotá and the Bogotá River originates close to Nemocón. The median temperature of Nemocón is 12.8 °C. The municipality borders Tausa in the north, Zipaquirá and Gachancipá in the south, Suesca in the east, and Cogua in the west.

== Etymology ==
Nemocón is derived from Enemocón and means "The cry or sadness of the warrior" in the Chibcha language. Another etymology is that the town is named after zipa Nemequene.

== History ==
=== Prehistory ===
Archaeological evidence surfaced by Gonzalo Correal Urrego in 1979 and Ana María Groot in 1992 has shown that Nemocón was inhabited early in the history of inhabitation of the Altiplano Cundiboyacense. One of the oldest evidence of human settlement; lithic scraper tools, bone tools and the remains of food of the hunter-gatherers (deer, foxes, jaguars and rodents) has been dated at 7640 BP. The inhabitants of the area lived under rock shelters, similar to Tequendama.

=== Herrera Period ===
==== Checua ====
The archaeological site Checua, at 7 kilometres (4.3 mi) north from the urban centre of Nemocón, provided evidence carbon dated at around 6500 BCE. First researcher of Checua was Colombian anthropologist and archaeologist Ana María Groot. In later years other archaeological sites have been found. Rock art has been discovered at various sites in Nemocón, among others at the border with Suesca.

This lithic period, part of the Andean preceramic, predates the Herrera Period of which archaeological evidence has been found by Marianne Cardale de Schrimpff in 1975, 1976 and the 1980s. Remains of deer, guinea pigs, rabbits, pecaris, howler monkeys and armadillos have been discovered in Nemocón and formed an important part of the diet of the people. Ceramics of Nemocón date to the 4th century BC and showed that Nemocón in those ages was already important in the extraction of salt. Excavations in Nemocón also have revealed the use of needles.

=== Muisca ===
The Herrera Period was followed by the culturally advanced civilisation of the Muisca, organised in their loose Muisca Confederation. The Muisca Period typically commenced in 800 AD and the people were named Pueblo de la Sal; "Salt People" because of their trading in the product."Daza 2013 p22" /> Ceramics of this period found in Nemocón originated from farther away on the Altiplano and ceramics of Nemocón and Zipaquirá found elsewhere on the Bogotá savanna are related to the salt trade. Of the central Colombian indigenous peoples, only the Lache and U'wa were the other miners of salt. The Muisca exploited halite in various locations in their territories, among others in Nemocón, Zipaquirá, Sesquilé, Tausa, Gámeza, and Guachetá. Nemocón was a market town where the salt was traded. A smaller salt mine was located in Sopó. Early evidence of salt extraction dates back to the end of the first millennium BC.

The Muisca women extracted the salt from a brine in large pots. According to chronicler Juan de Santa Gertrudis, used the mineral to dry and preserve their fish and meat.

=== Colonial period ===
During the Spanish colonial period, the salt was exploited by hand labour of the surviving Muisca.

Modern Nemocón was founded on July 26, 1600 by Luis Henríquez. As of 1614, wheat was successfully cultivated in Nemocón.

=== Nemocón today ===
In modern times the extraction of salt continued and the economical activity of the town has expanded to the cultivation of flowers and the extraction of kaolin.

== Tourism ==
Famous for its salt mine and museum, Nemocón is a touristic village and linked by train from Bogotá. The salt mine is the second-largest of Colombia, after the Salt Cathedral in neighbouring Zipaquirá. Sunday is market day in Nemocón.

== Ferias ==
- Festival del floricultor
- September: Festival de Danzas
- December: Festival del macramé and Christmas lighting

== Born in Nemocón ==
- Ricardo Moros Urbina, Painter s.XIX. Founder Colombian History Academy.
- Miguel Gutiérrez Nieto, Bogotá´s National Prefect and Major under Mosquera's presidency, S. XIX
- Eustacio Sanz de Santamaría, Foreign Affairs Secretary under Holguín's presidency. Diplomatic and writer
- Felipa Molina Morales and Antonio de Luna, Commoners revolution indigenous leaders.
- Luis Antonio Orjuela Quintero, Historian,. academic, educator.
- Manuel Medardo Espinosa, romantic poet.
- Julio Rubiano, former professional cyclist

== Trivia ==
- Remains of a mastodont have been found in Nemocón.
- Scenes of the movie The 33 were filmed in the salt mine of Nemocón.
- The second leg of The Amazing Race 32 featured the salt mine of Nemocón and the Templo Parroquial San Francisco de Asís.

== Climate ==
Climate data for Nemocón (Checua-Nemocon), elevation 2,580 m (8,460 ft), (1981–2010)
Month	Jan	Feb	Mar	Apr	May	Jun	Jul	Aug	Sep	Oct	Nov	Dec	Year
Mean daily maximum °C (°F)	20.6 (69.1)	20.2 (68.4)	20.8 (69.4)	19.7 (67.5)	18.9 (66.0)	17.9 (64.2)	17.9 (64.2)	18.5 (65.3)	19.2 (66.6)	19.9 (67.8)	20.4 (68.7)	20.5 (68.9)	19.5 (67.1)
Daily mean °C (°F)	13.8 (56.8)	14.0 (57.2)	14.4 (57.9)	14.4 (57.9)	14.2 (57.6)	13.6 (56.5)	13.6 (56.5)	13.6 (56.5)	13.9 (57.0)	14.1 (57.4)	14.6 (58.3)	14.1 (57.4)	14.0 (57.2)
Mean daily minimum °C (°F)	7.1 (44.8)	8.1 (46.6)	8.7 (47.7)	10.1 (50.2)	10.5 (50.9)	9.8 (49.6)	10.0 (50.0)	9.5 (49.1)	9.1 (48.4)	9.5 (49.1)	9.8 (49.6)	8.0 (46.4)	9.1 (48.4)
Average precipitation mm (inches)	23.7 (0.93)	53.0 (2.09)	69.8 (2.75)	78.9 (3.11)	67.3 (2.65)	34.6 (1.36)	37.0 (1.46)	37.5 (1.48)	59.1 (2.33)	74.8 (2.94)	61.0 (2.40)	31.5 (1.24)	628.1 (24.73)
Average precipitation days	4	7	9	12	14	12	15	15	11	12	11	7	125
Average relative humidity (%)	73	73	74	79	80	81	80	79	77	79	79	76	78
Mean monthly sunshine hours	195.3	144.0	158.1	123.0	127.1	99.0	139.5	124.0	141.0	136.4	135.0	167.4	1,689.8
Mean daily sunshine hours	6.3	5.1	5.1	4.1	4.1	3.3	4.5	4.0	4.7	4.4	4.5	5.4	4.6
Source: Instituto de Hidrologia Meteorologia y Estudios Ambientales

== Gallery ==
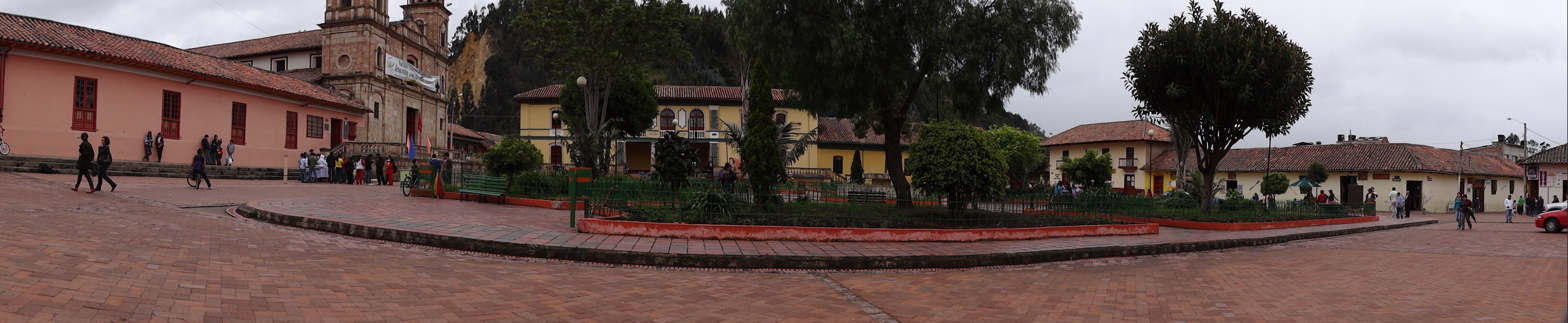
Panorama of the central square of Nemocón
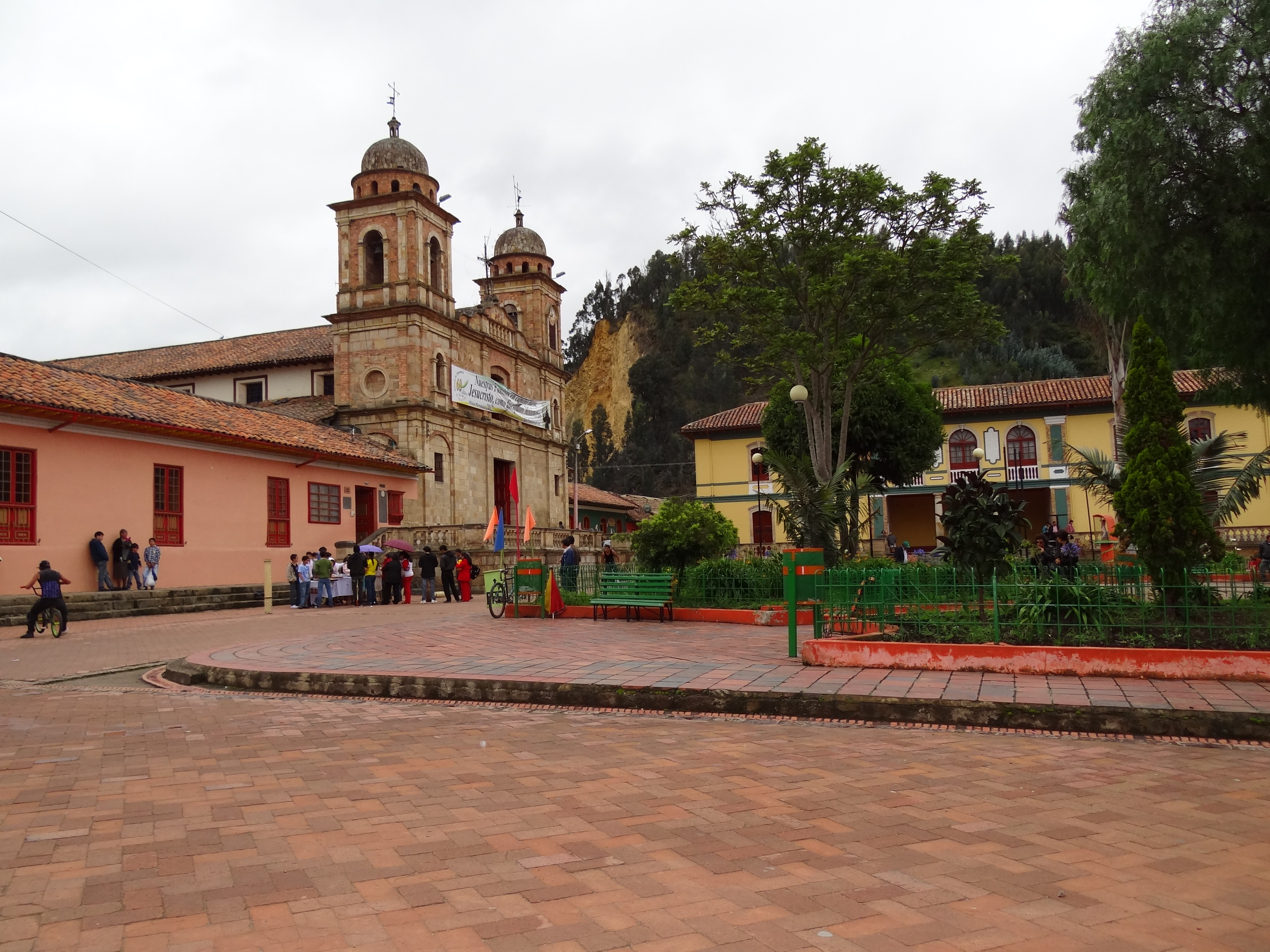
Central square of Nemocón

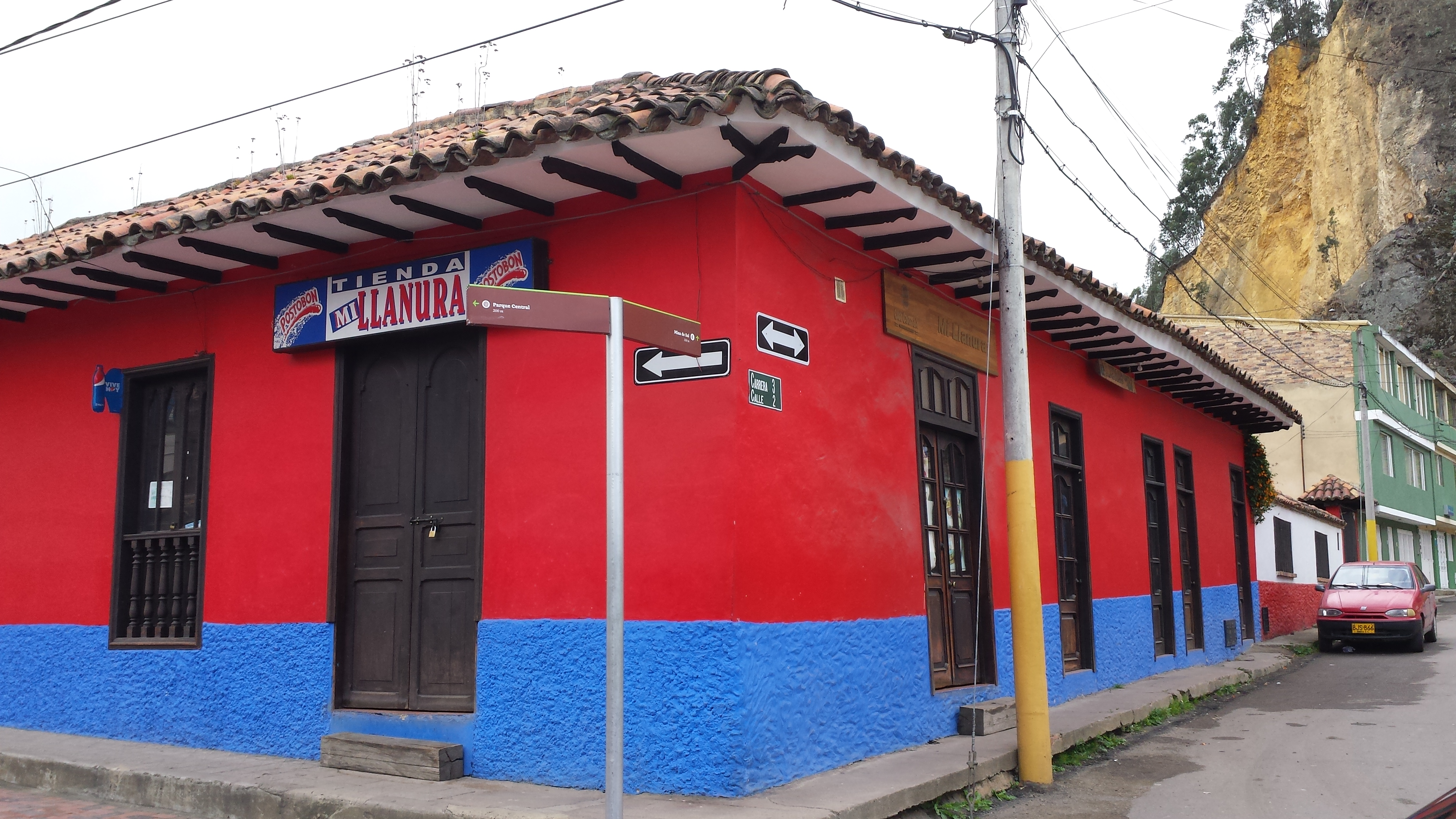
House in Nemocón

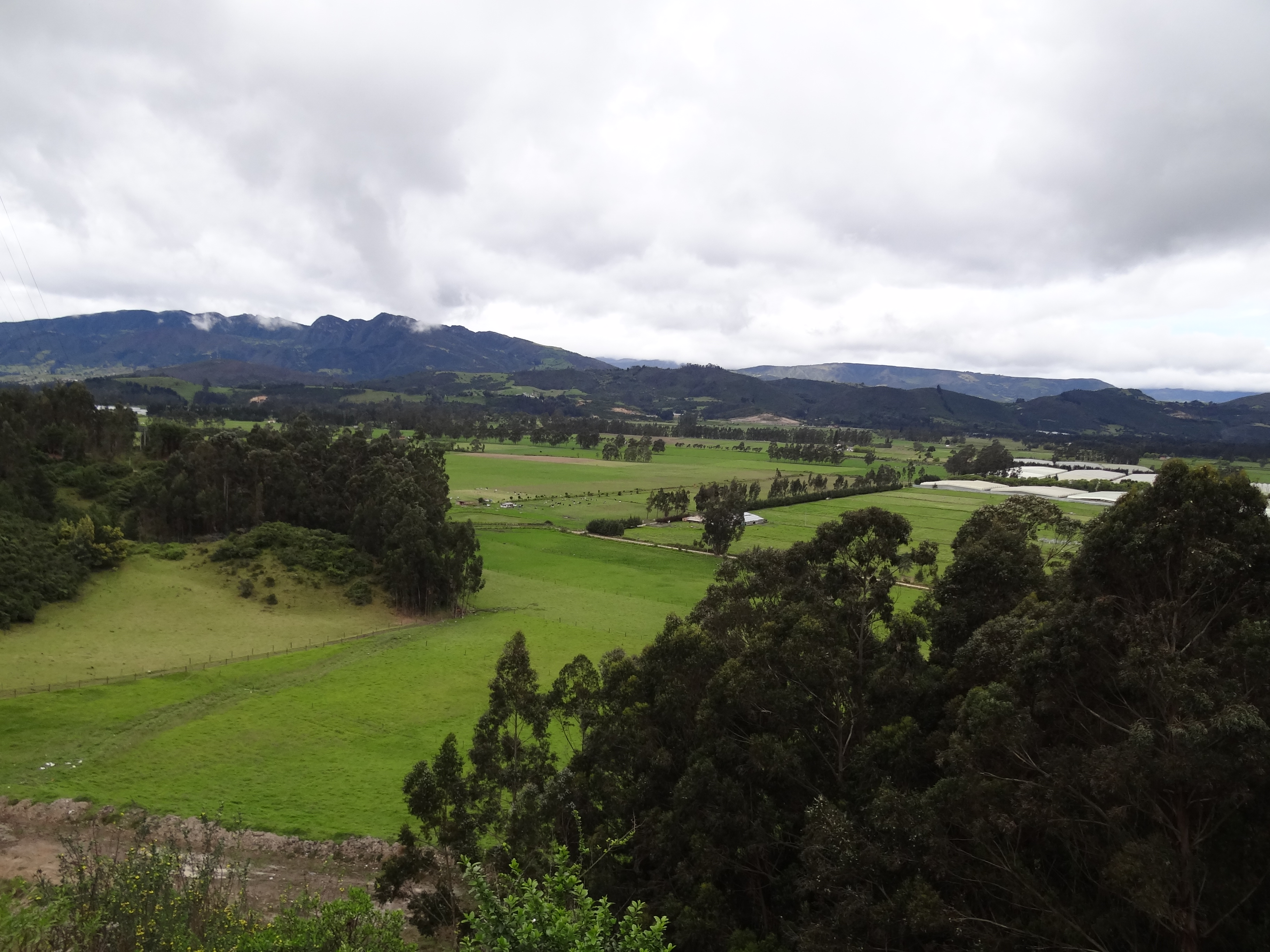
Rural Nemocón

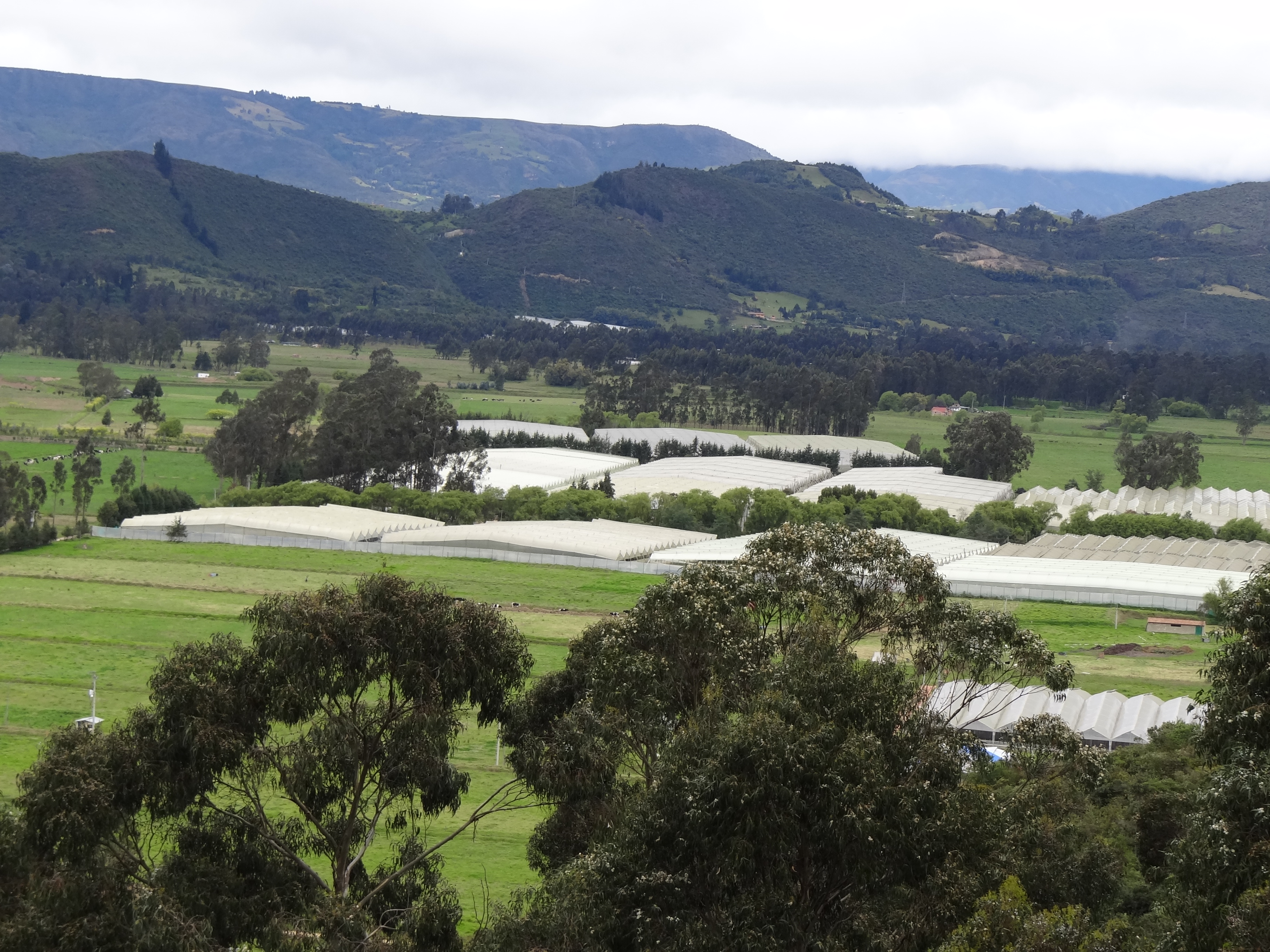
Greenhouses in rural Nemocón

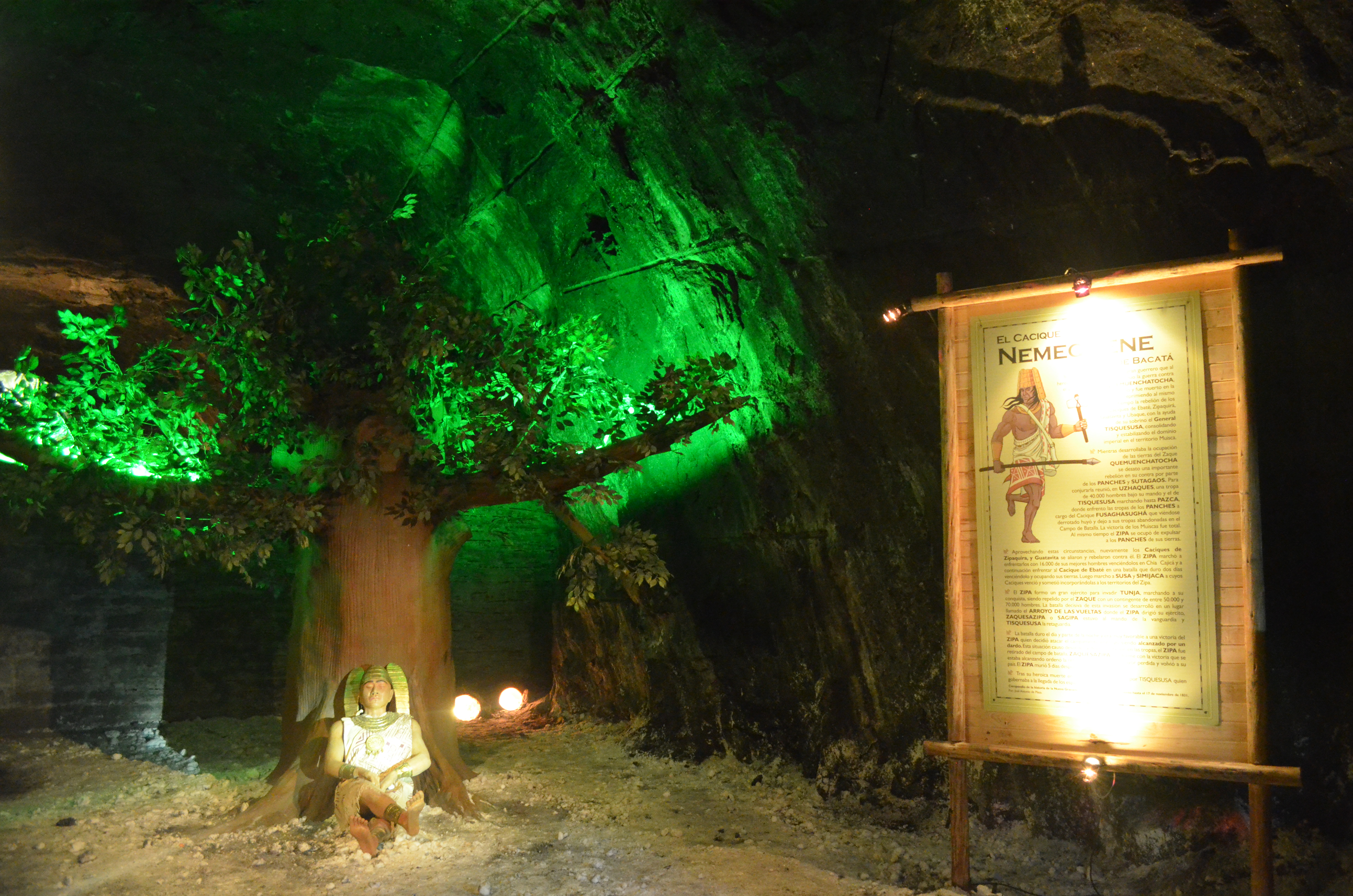
Statue of Nemequene in Nemocón
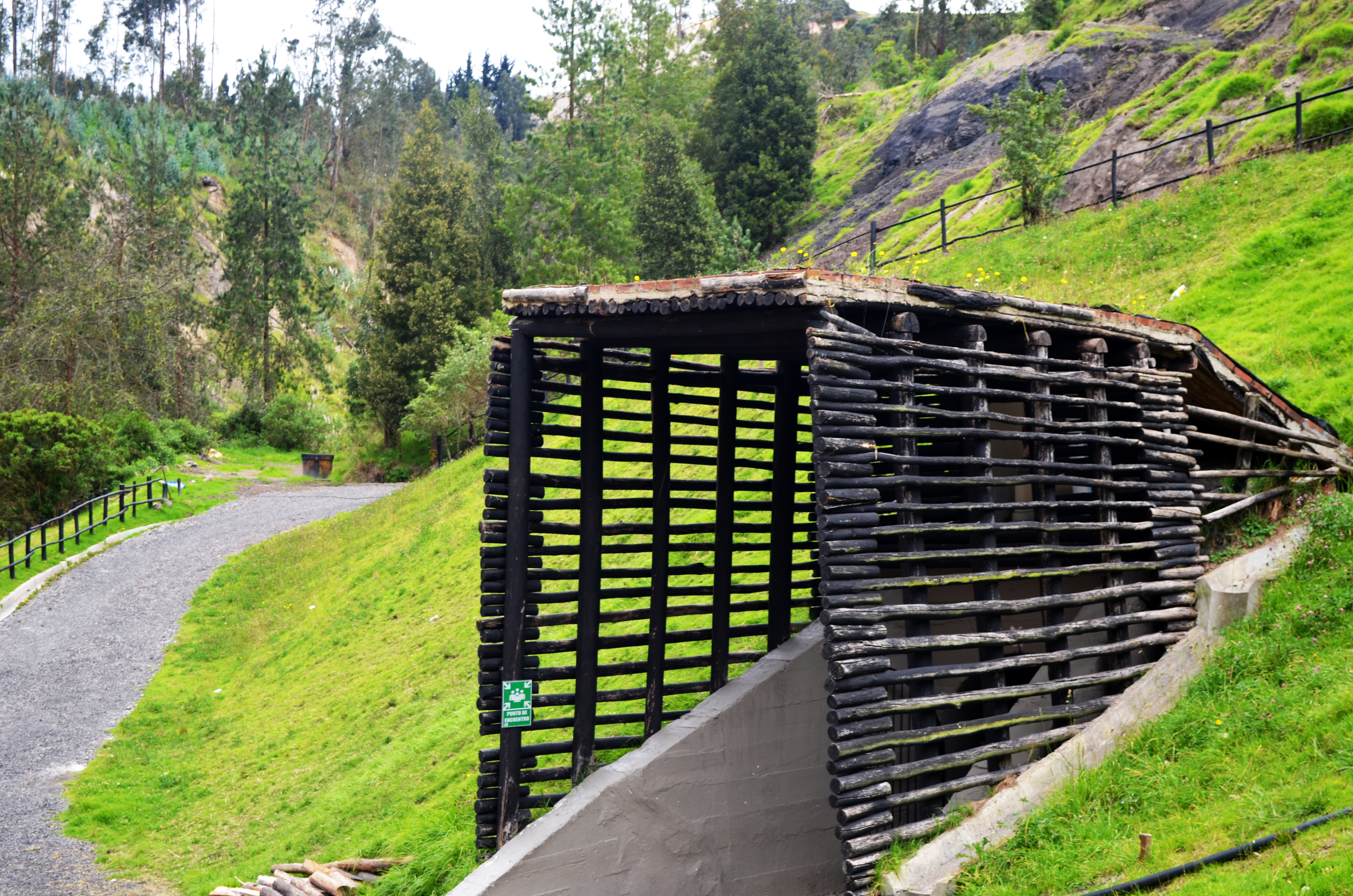
Entrance of the salt mine of Nemocón

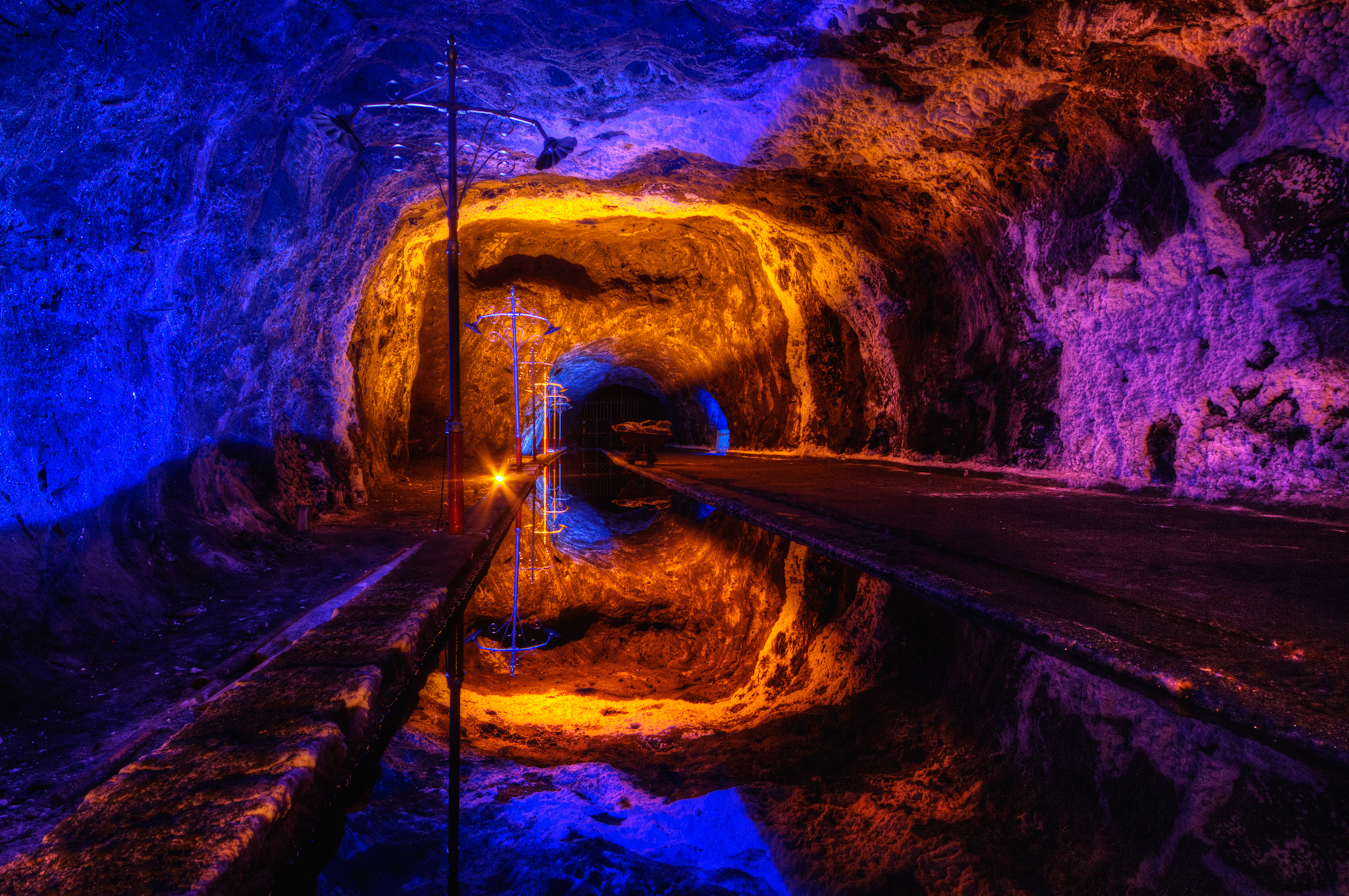
Salt mine

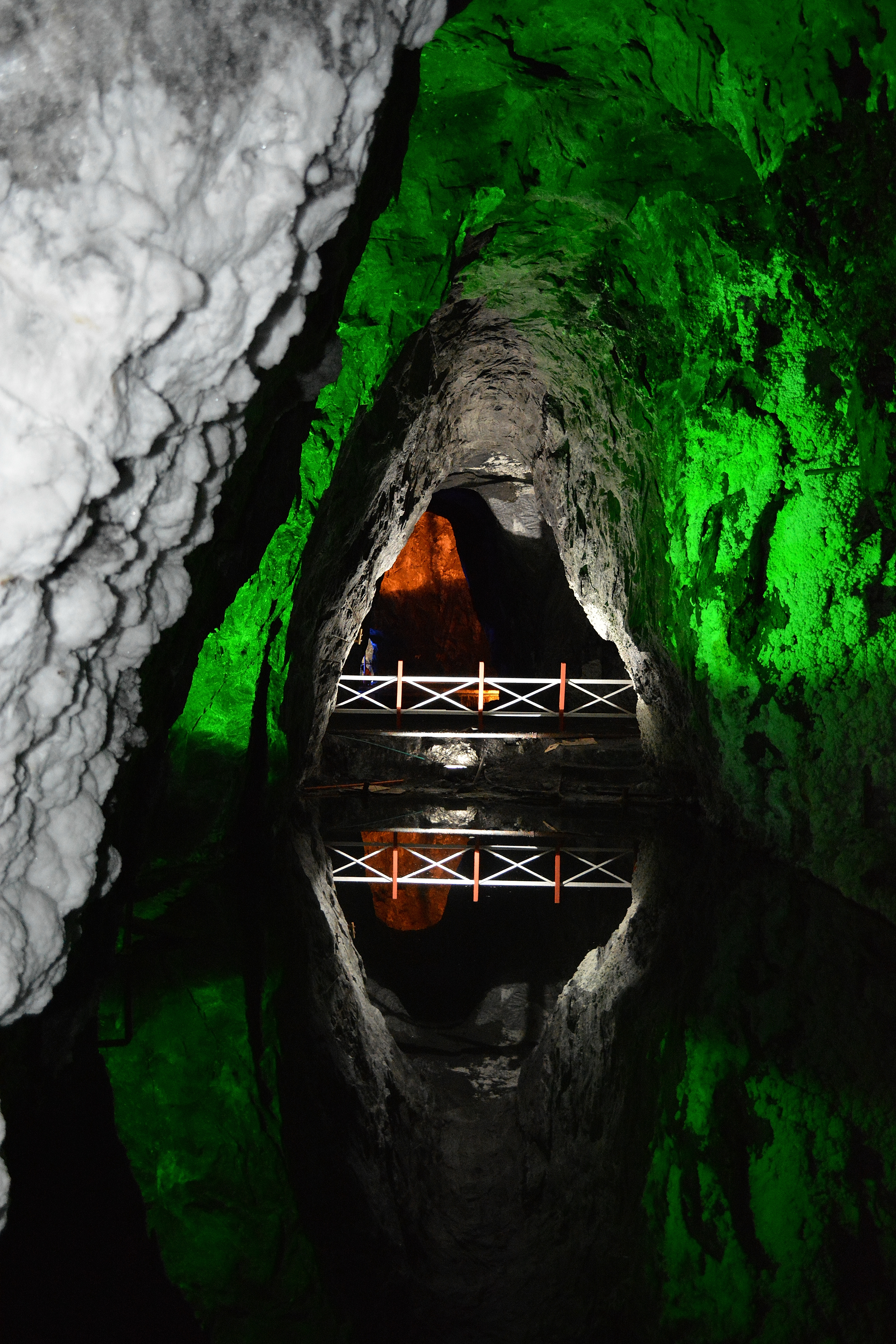
Salt mine

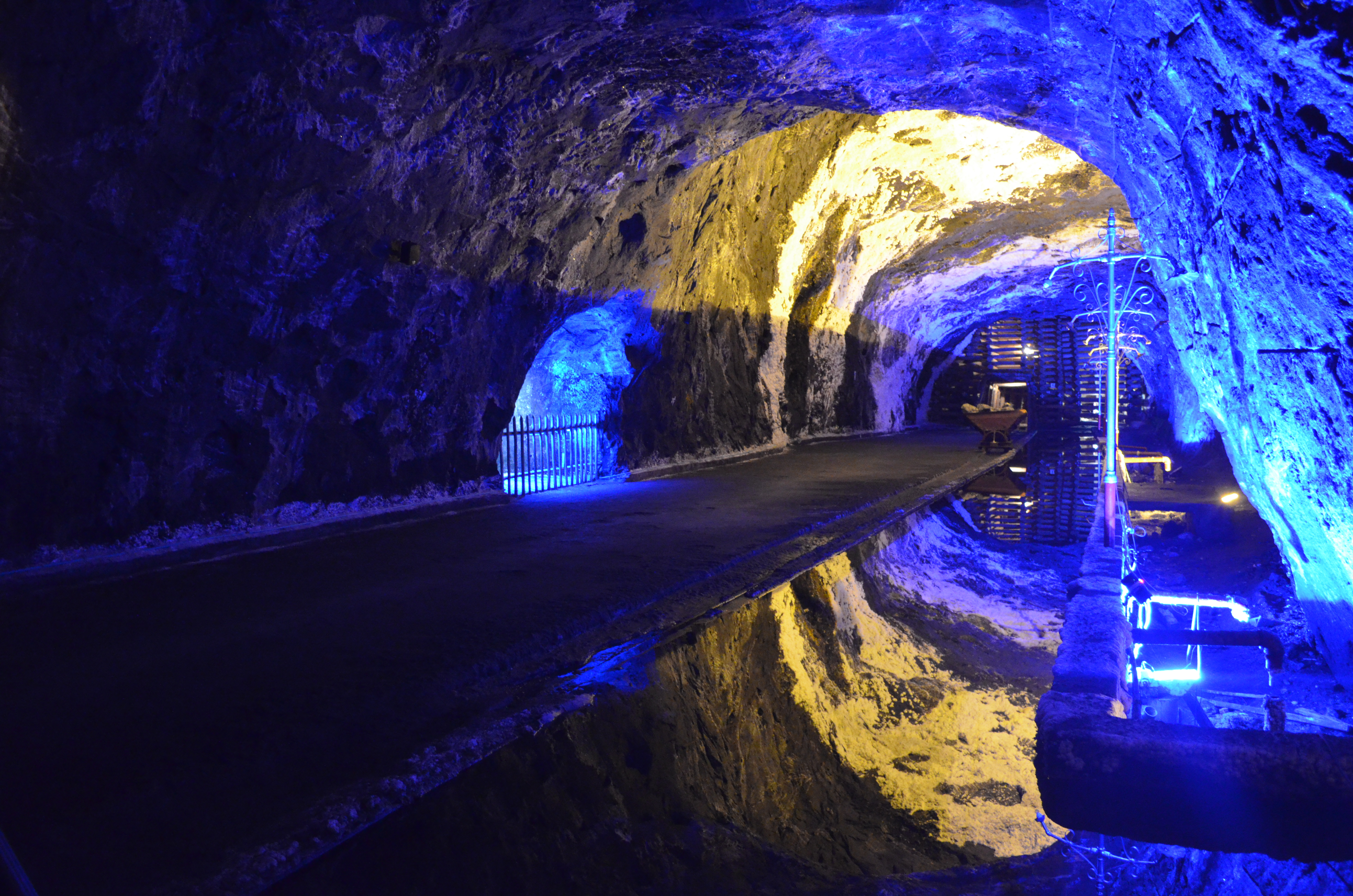
Salt mine

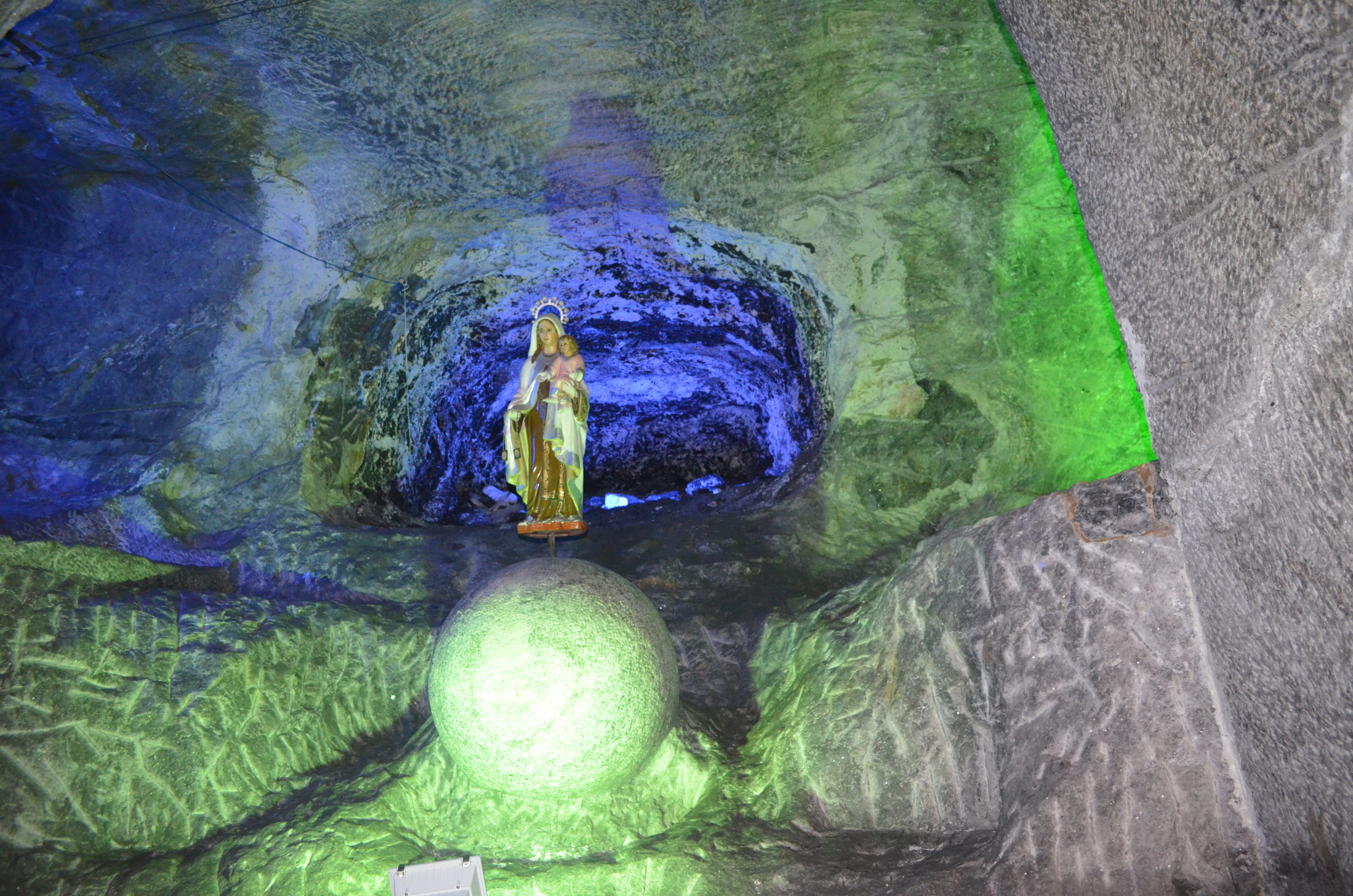
Salt mine

== See also ==
- Muisca salt mining
- Zipaquirá, Tausa, Muisca women, Nemequene
