= Gachancipá =

- Municipality and town
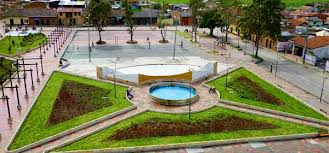
- Central square

- Flag Coat of arms

- Location of the municipality and town inside Cundinamarca department of Colombia

- Location in Colombia
- Coordinates: 4°59′27″N 73°52′23″W
- Country: Colombia
- Department: Cundinamarca
- Province: Central Savanna Province
- Founded: 1 January 1612

Government
  - Mayor: José Joaquín Cubides Ariza (2016-2019)

Area
  - Municipality and town: 43.06 km^{2} (16.63 sq mi)
  - Urban: 1.03 km^{2} (0.40 sq mi)
- Elevation: 2,568 m (8,425 ft)

Population (2018 census)
  - Municipality and town: 17,026
  - Density: 395.4/km^{2} (1,024/sq mi)
  - Urban: 11,252
  - Urban density: 10,900/km^{2} (28,300/sq mi)
- Time zone: UTC-5 (Colombia Standard Time)
- Website: Official website

Gachancipá is a municipality and town of Colombia in the Central Savanna Province, part of the department of Cundinamarca. The urban centre is located on the Altiplano Cundiboyacense at 42 kilometres (26 mi) from the capital Bogotá. The municipality borders Suesca and Nemocón in the north, Tocancipá in the south, Sesquilé and Guatavita in the east and Zipaquirá in the west.

== Etymology ==
The name Gachancipá comes from Chibcha and means "Pottery of the zipa".

== History ==
The area of Gachancipá before the Spanish conquest was inhabited by the Muisca, organised in their loose Muisca Confederation. Gachancipá, as the name suggests, was ruled by the zipa based in Bacatá.

Modern Gachancipá was founded on January 1, 1612, but the founders are unknown.

In the late 18th century Muisca scholar José Domingo Duquesne was based in Gachancipá. A school in the town is named after him.

== Economy ==
The economy of Gachancipá traditionally was centered around agriculture and livestock farming. In recent years flowers are cultivated in the municipality.

== Gallery ==
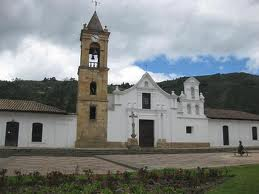
Church of Gachancipá

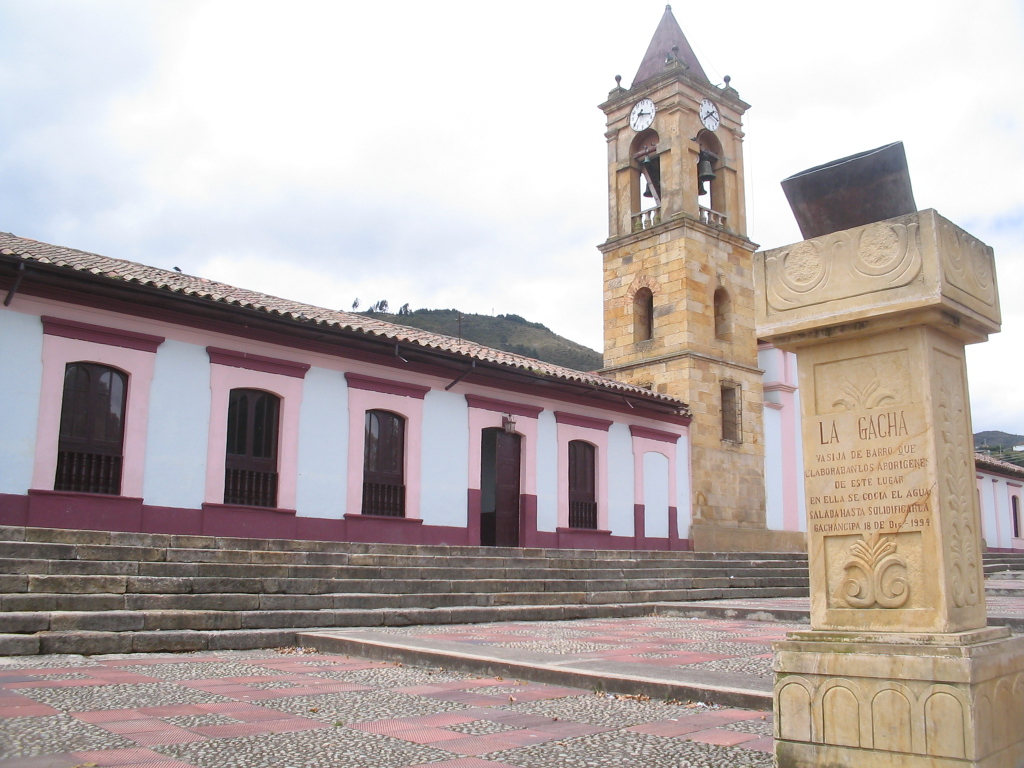
Church

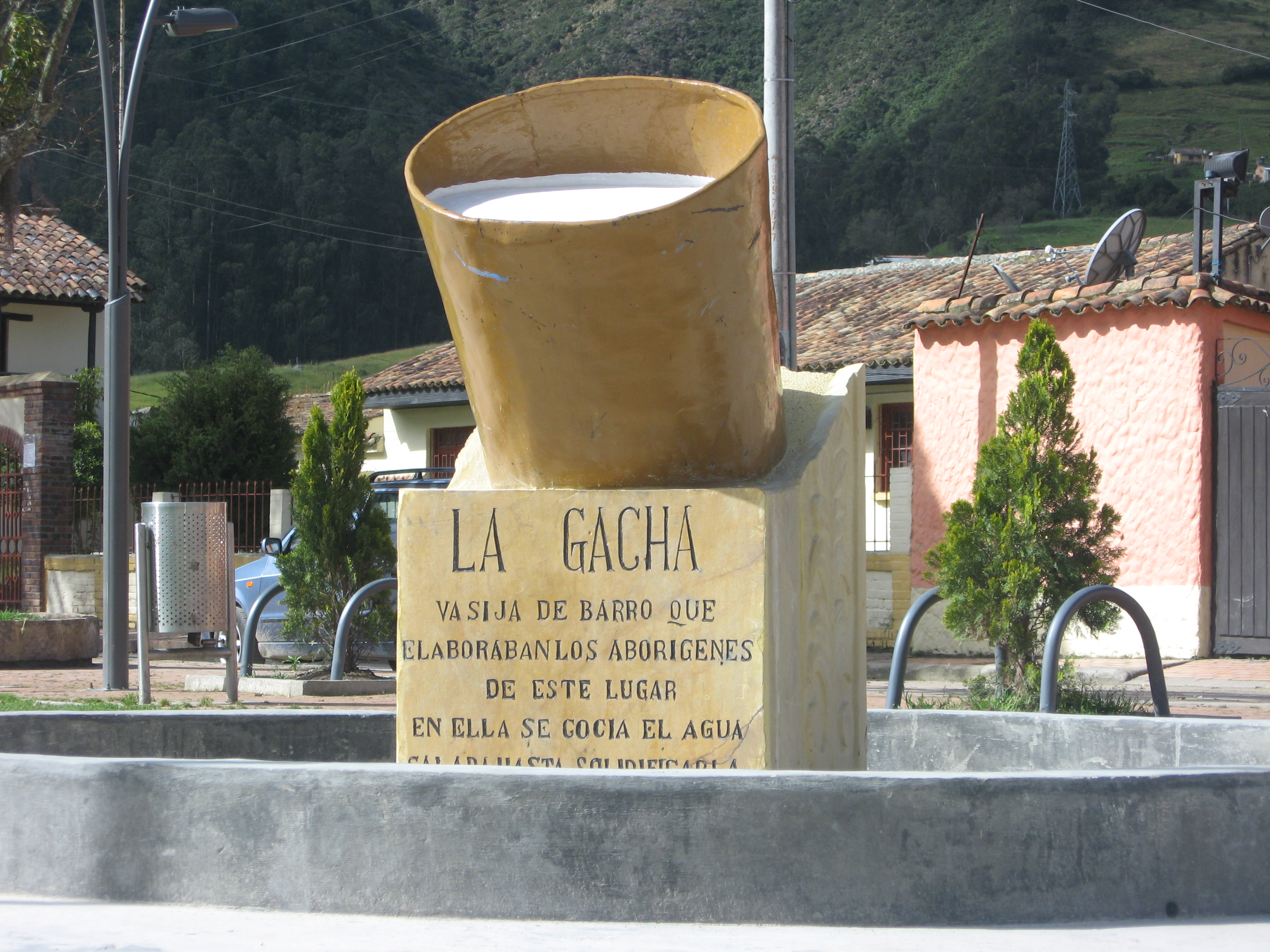
Monument to the indigenous people
