= Cota, Cundinamarca =

Cota Gota
- Municipality and town
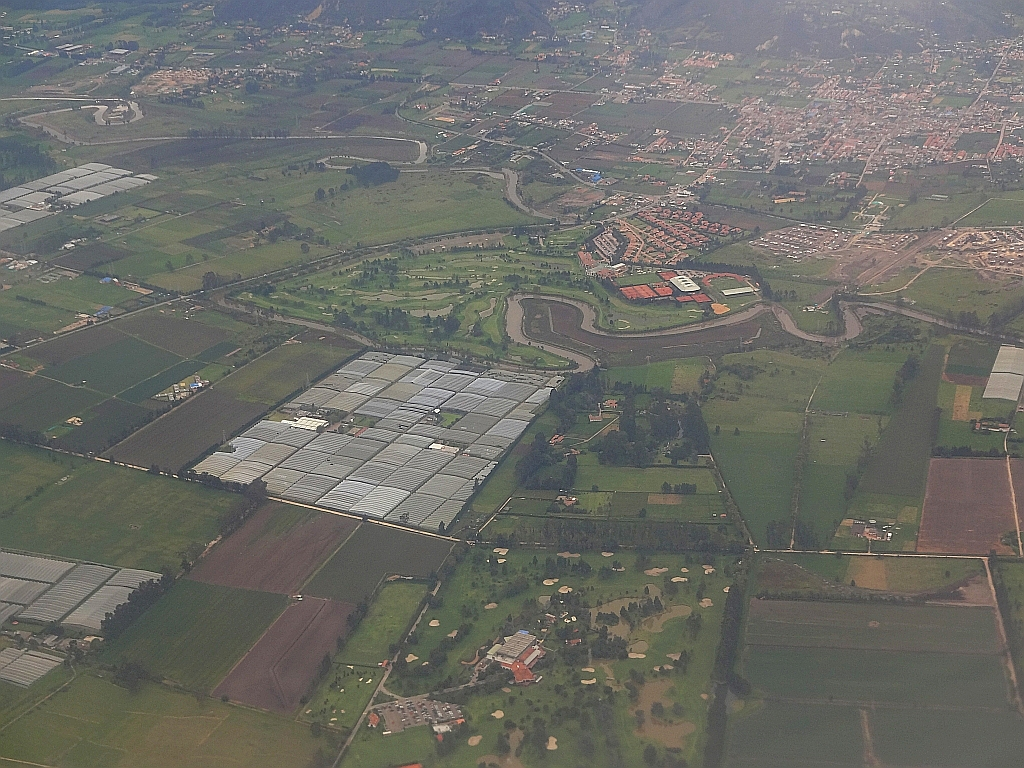
- Aerial view of Cota and the Bogotá River

- Flag

- Location of the municipality and town inside Cundinamarca Department of Colombia

- Location in Colombia
- Coordinates: 4°49′N 74°6′W
- Country: Colombia
- Department: Cundinamarca
- Province: Central Savanna Province
- Founded: 29 November 1604
- Founder: Diego Gómez de Mena

Government
  - Mayor: Carlos Julio Moreno Gomez (2016-2019)

Area
  - Municipality and town: 53.68 km^{2} (20.73 sq mi)
  - Urban: 3.17 km^{2} (1.22 sq mi)
- Elevation: 2,566 m (8,419 ft)

Population (2018 census)
  - Municipality and town: 32,691
  - Density: 609.0/km^{2} (1,577/sq mi)
  - Urban: 20,462
  - Urban density: 6,450/km^{2} (16,700/sq mi)
- Time zone: UTC-5 (Colombia Standard Time)
- Website: Official website

Cota is a municipality and town of Colombia in the Central Savanna Province of the department of Cundinamarca. Cota is part of the metropolitan area of Colombian capital Bogotá which centre is 26 kilometres (16 mi) away. The urban centre of Cota is located at an altitude of 2,566 metres (8,419 ft) and the municipality borders Chía in the north, Funza in the south, Suba, part of Bogotá in the east and Tenjo in the west.

== History ==
In the time before the Spanish conquest, the Bogotá savanna was inhabited by the Muisca, organized in the southern Muisca Confederation. The ruler of Bacatá (zipa) controlled Cota. The Muisca called the town Gota, which is either a personal name of derived from cota; "curl". Cota still has a surviving Muisca population.

Modern Cota was founded on November 29, 1604 by Diego Gómez de Mena.

== Economy ==
Cota has a small economy mainly based on agriculture; cabbage and lettuce.

== Education ==
Given its proximity to the Colombian capital, thanks to its quiet surroundings, many schools have settled in Cota with their facilities and venues; such as the following:

Oakland Colegio Campestre, Nuevo Gimnasio Cristiano, Colegio Refous, Colegio José Max León, Summerhill School, colegio Gimnasio Campestre Los Sauces, Gimnasio El Portillo, Colegio Nuevo Reino de Granda, Colegio Nuestra Señora del Rosario, jardín Gimnasio Campestre El Shadai, colegio Gimnasio Campestre San Francisco de Sales and since 2009 Cota is home for NASA´s Educational Program called Colombia Space School.

   Public schools

   I.E.D. Enrique Pardo Parra (Urban).

   I.E.D. Institute Parcels (Rural).

== Born in Cota ==
- Juan Pablo Forero, professional cyclist.

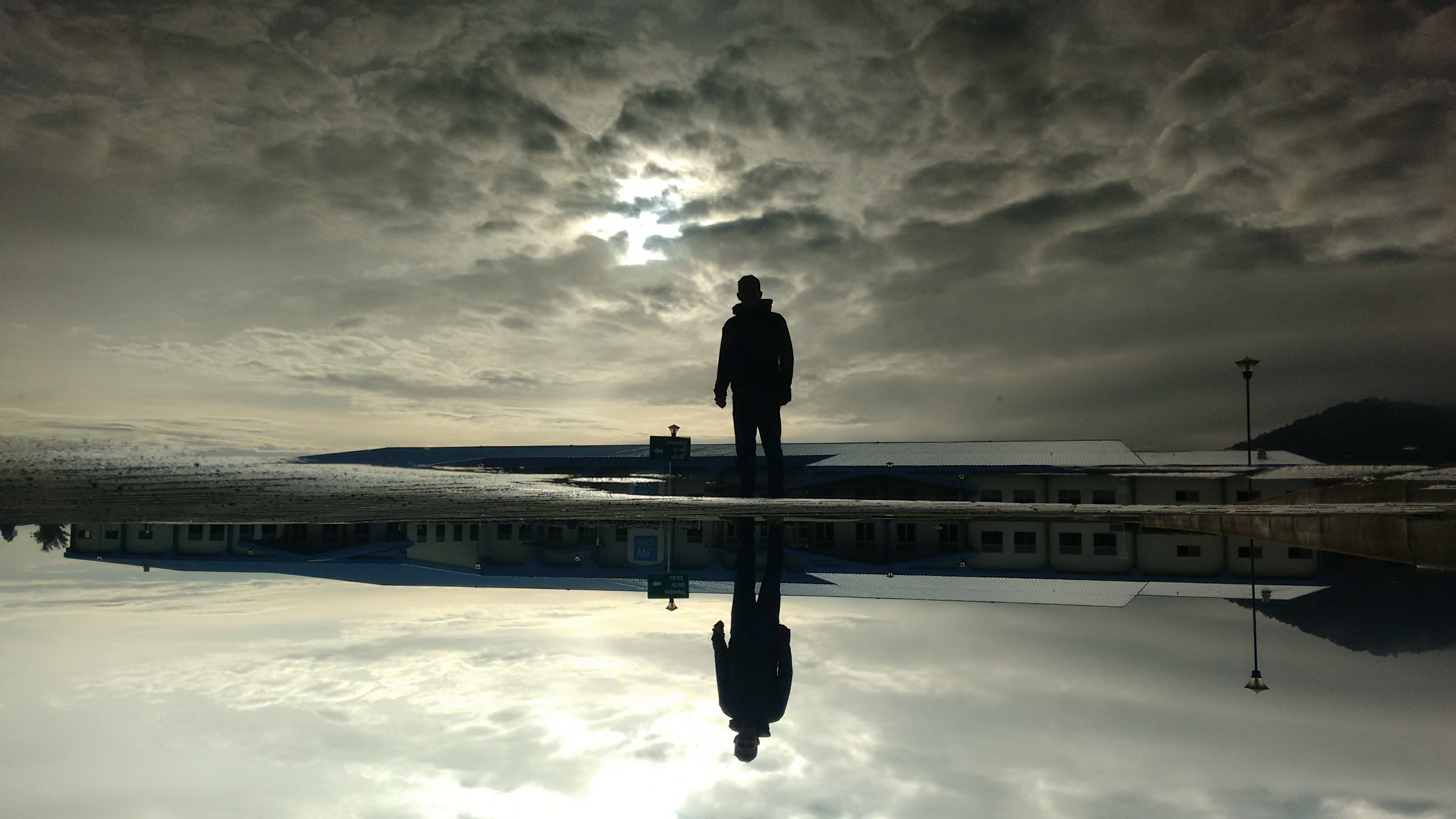
Amanecer en Cota Cundinamarca

== Climate ==
Climate data for Cota (Guaymaral Airport), elevation 2,560 m (8,400 ft), (1971–2000)
Month	Jan	Feb	Mar	Apr	May	Jun	Jul	Aug	Sep	Oct	Nov	Dec	Year
Mean daily maximum °C (°F)	20.8 (69.4)	20.9 (69.6)	20.4 (68.7)	20.1 (68.2)	19.5 (67.1)	18.7 (65.7)	18.4 (65.1)	18.9 (66.0)	19.3 (66.7)	19.8 (67.6)	20.2 (68.4)	20.4 (68.7)	19.8 (67.6)
Daily mean °C (°F)	13.0 (55.4)	13.3 (55.9)	13.6 (56.5)	13.8 (56.8)	13.6 (56.5)	13.1 (55.6)	12.8 (55.0)	13.0 (55.4)	13.1 (55.6)	13.2 (55.8)	13.2 (55.8)	13.0 (55.4)	13.2 (55.8)
Mean daily minimum °C (°F)	6.8 (44.2)	7.5 (45.5)	8.5 (47.3)	9.2 (48.6)	9.3 (48.7)	9.1 (48.4)	8.6 (47.5)	8.3 (46.9)	8.2 (46.8)	8.6 (47.5)	8.9 (48.0)	7.7 (45.9)	8.4 (47.1)
Average precipitation mm (inches)	28.8 (1.13)	47.9 (1.89)	65.4 (2.57)	100.5 (3.96)	89.9 (3.54)	54.1 (2.13)	39.4 (1.55)	41.2 (1.62)	65.7 (2.59)	99.1 (3.90)	85.0 (3.35)	45.7 (1.80)	762.7 (30.03)
Average precipitation days	8	10	12	16	20	17	16	16	14	17	17	12	176
Average relative humidity (%)	75	75	76	79	79	78	77	76	77	79	79	77	77
Mean monthly sunshine hours	167.4	132.9	120.9	99.0	105.4	99.0	117.8	111.6	102.0	105.4	123.0	167.4	1,451.8
Mean daily sunshine hours	5.4	4.7	3.9	3.3	3.4	3.3	3.8	3.6	3.4	3.4	4.1	5.4	4.0
Source: Instituto de Hidrologia Meteorologia y Estudios Ambientales
