= Central Savanna Province =

Central Savanna Province Provincia de Sabana Centro
- Province
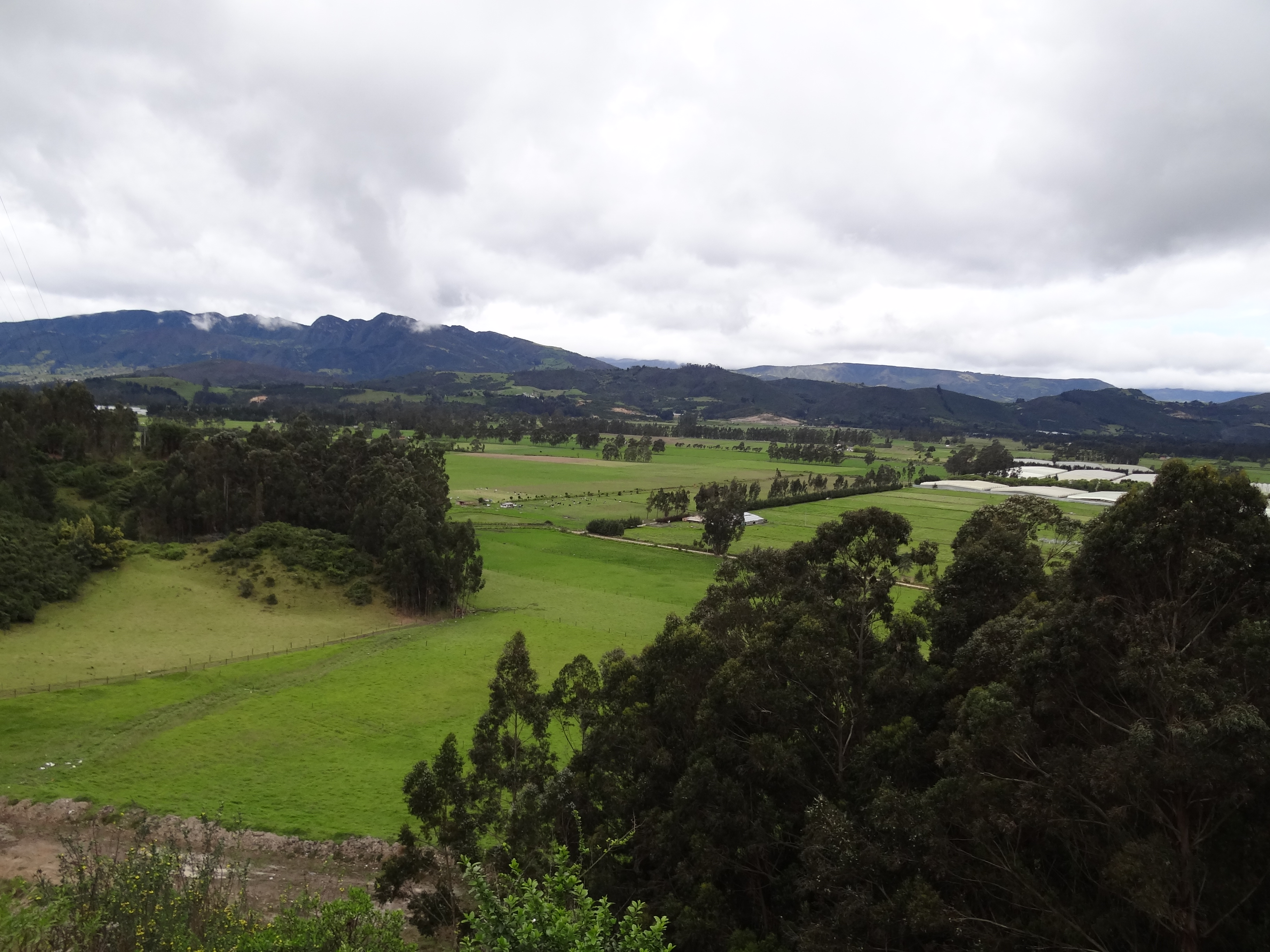
- Nemocón in Savanna Province
- Etymology: Bogotá savanna
- Location of Central Savanna Province in Colombia
- Coordinates: 4°56′50″N 74°2′30″W
- Country: Colombia
- Department: Cundinamarca
- Capital: Zipaquirá
- Municipalities: 11

Area
  - Total: 1,005.01 km^{2} (388.04 sq mi)

Population (2015)
  - Total: 490,274
  - Density: 487.830/km^{2} (1,263.47/sq mi)
- Time zone: UTC−05:00 (COT)
- Indigenous groups: Muisca

Central Savanna Province (Spanish: Sabana Centro) is one of the fifteen provinces of Cundinamarca, in Colombia. It is located in the central area of the department, and has 11 municipalities. The province capital is the city of Zipaquirá.

== Limits ==
- North: Ubaté Province
- West: Rionegro and Western Savanna Province
- South: Bogotá Capital District
- East: Guavio Province
- Northeast: Almeidas Province

=== Rivers ===
The Central Savanna Province is crossed by the Bogotá River and Rio Frío.

== Demographics ==
The most populous urban centers are Chía and Zipaquirá.

== Subdivision ==
The Central Savanna Province is subdivided into 11 municipalities:

Municipality bold is capital	Area km^{2}	Elevation (m) urban centre	Population 2015	Founded	Map
Cajicá	50.4	2558	56,875	1598	
Cogua	113	2600	22,361	1604	
Cota	55	2566	24,916	1604	
Chía	80	2564	129,652	1537	
Gachancipá	44	2568	14,442	1612	
Nemocón	98.1	2585	13,488	1600	
Sopó	111.5	2650	26,769	1653	
Tabio	74.5	2569	27,033	1603	
Tenjo	108	2587	18,387	1603	
Tocancipá	73.51	2605	31,975	1593	
Zipaquirá	197	2650	124,376	1600	
Total	1005.01		490,274		
