= Muisca agriculture =

Pre-Columbian agriculture in the Andes

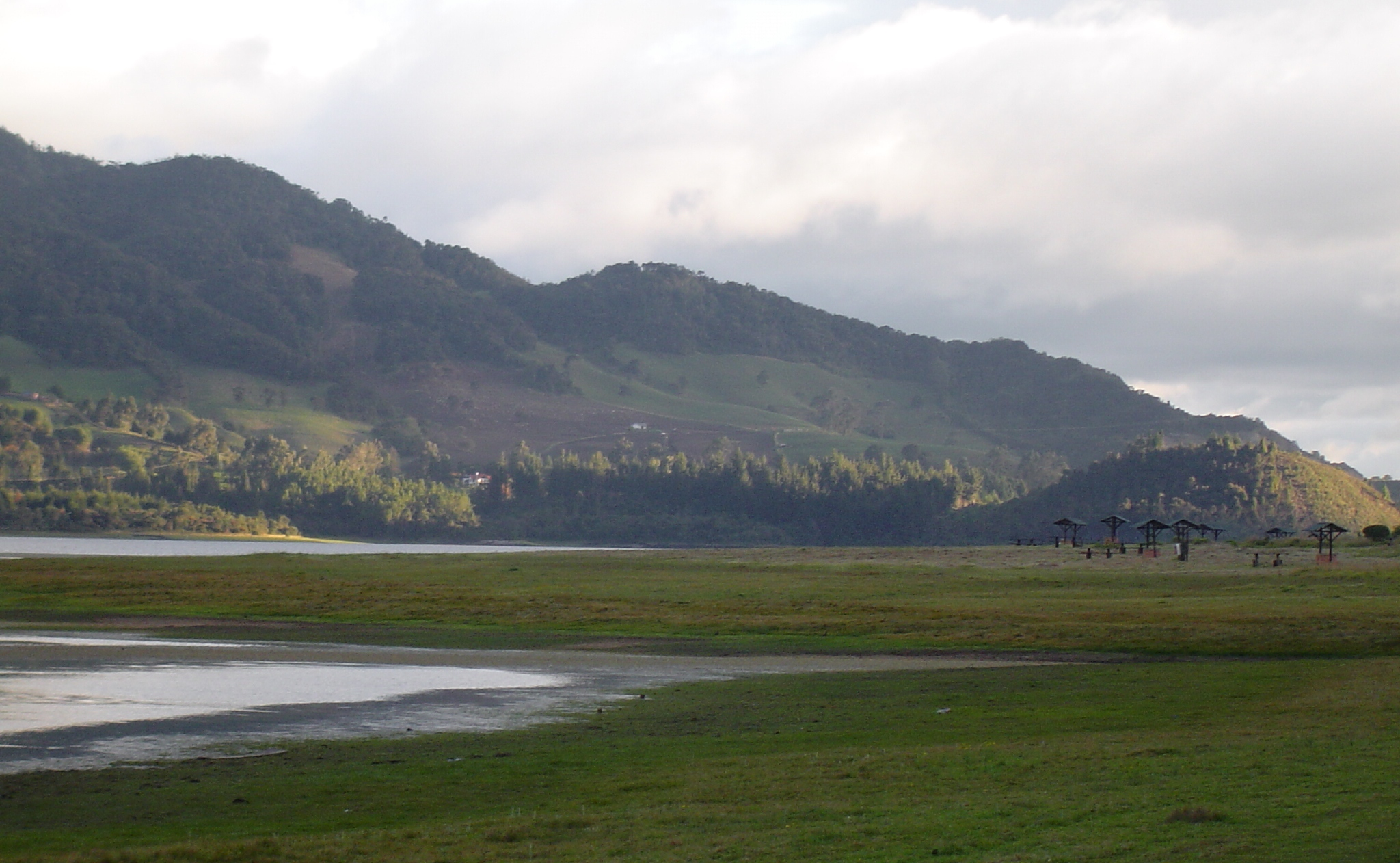
The Bogotá savanna, location of the agricultural fields of the Muisca

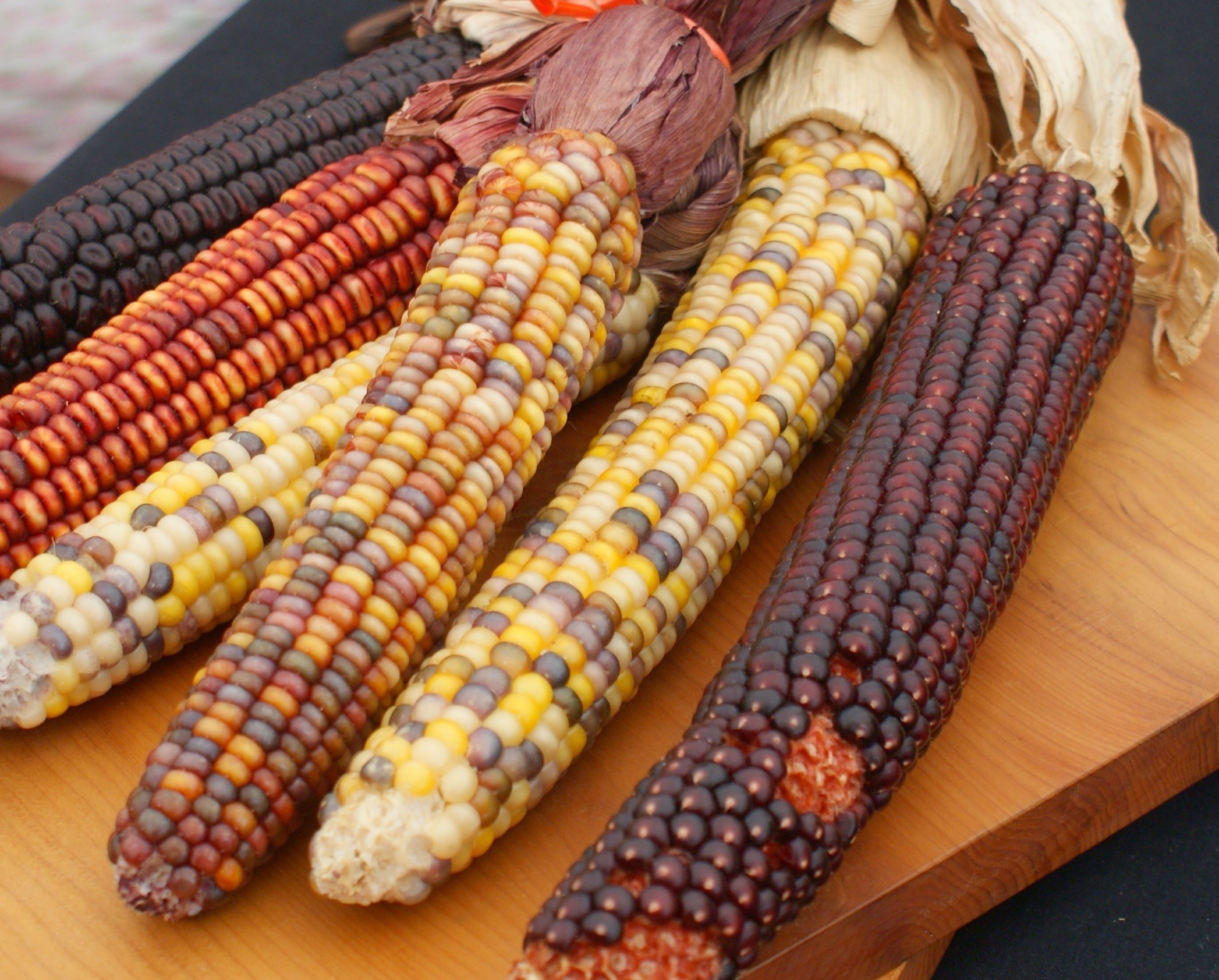
Maize was the main agricultural product for the Muisca

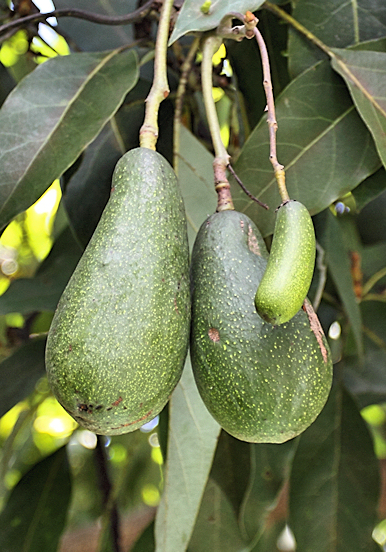
Avocados are a sub-tropical fruit, traded with indigenous neighbours who inhabited cooler areas

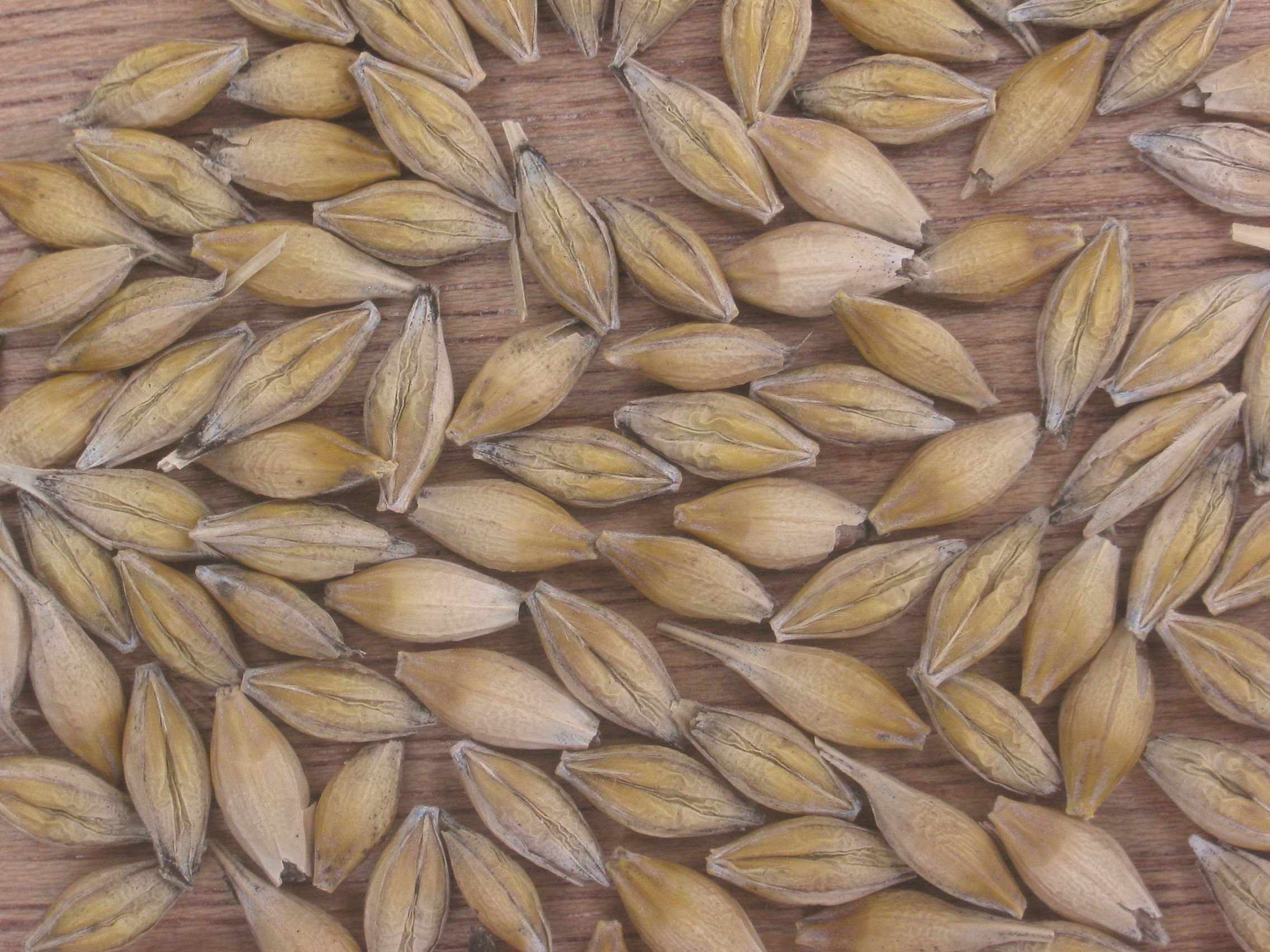
After the conquest of the Muisca lands, barley was introduced quickly and grew well on the fertile highlands

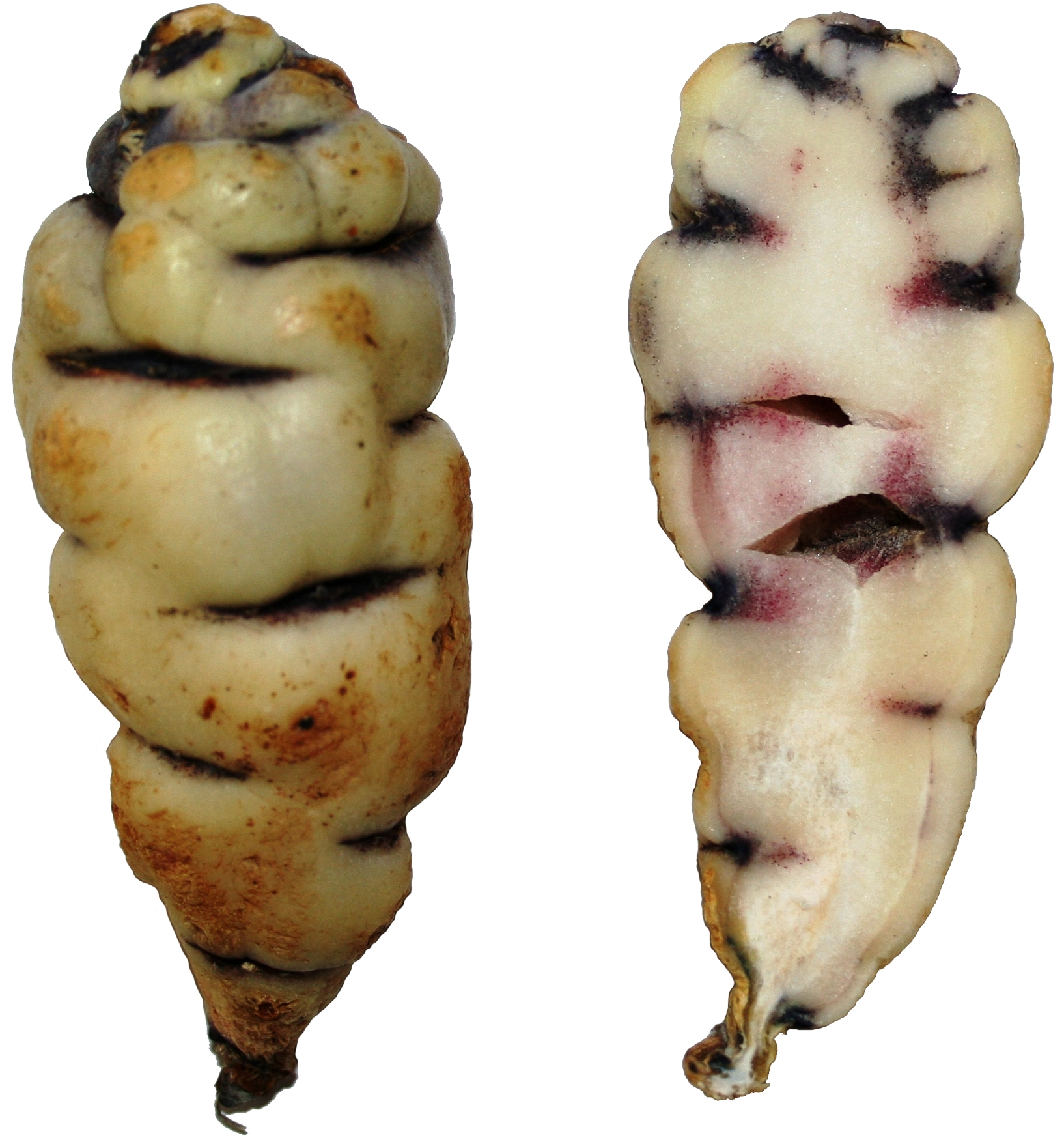
The cubio; a tuber cultivated in the higher altitude areas of the Muisca terrains

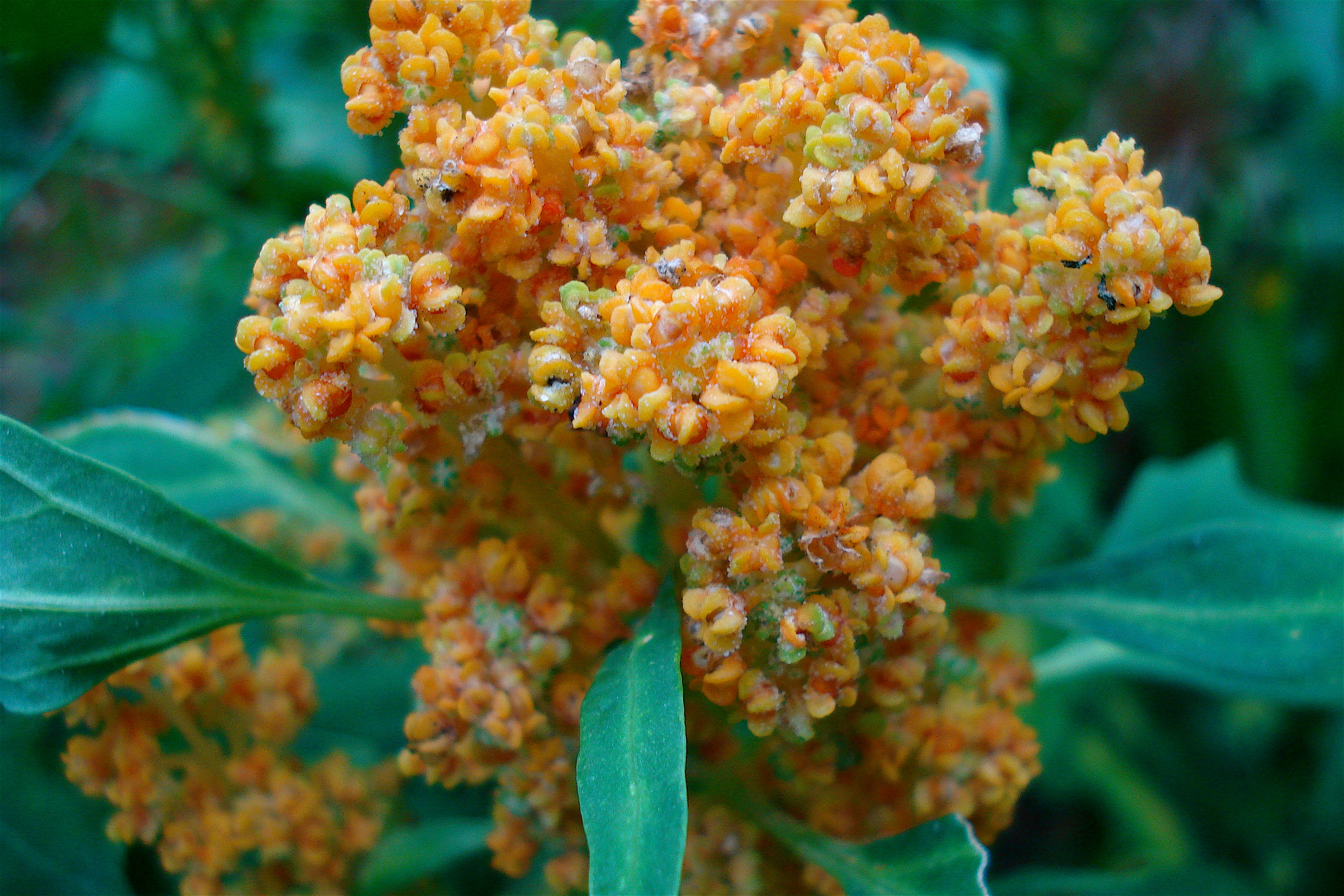
Quinoa was a plant originally from Peru, but cultivated in the highlands of the Muisca territories

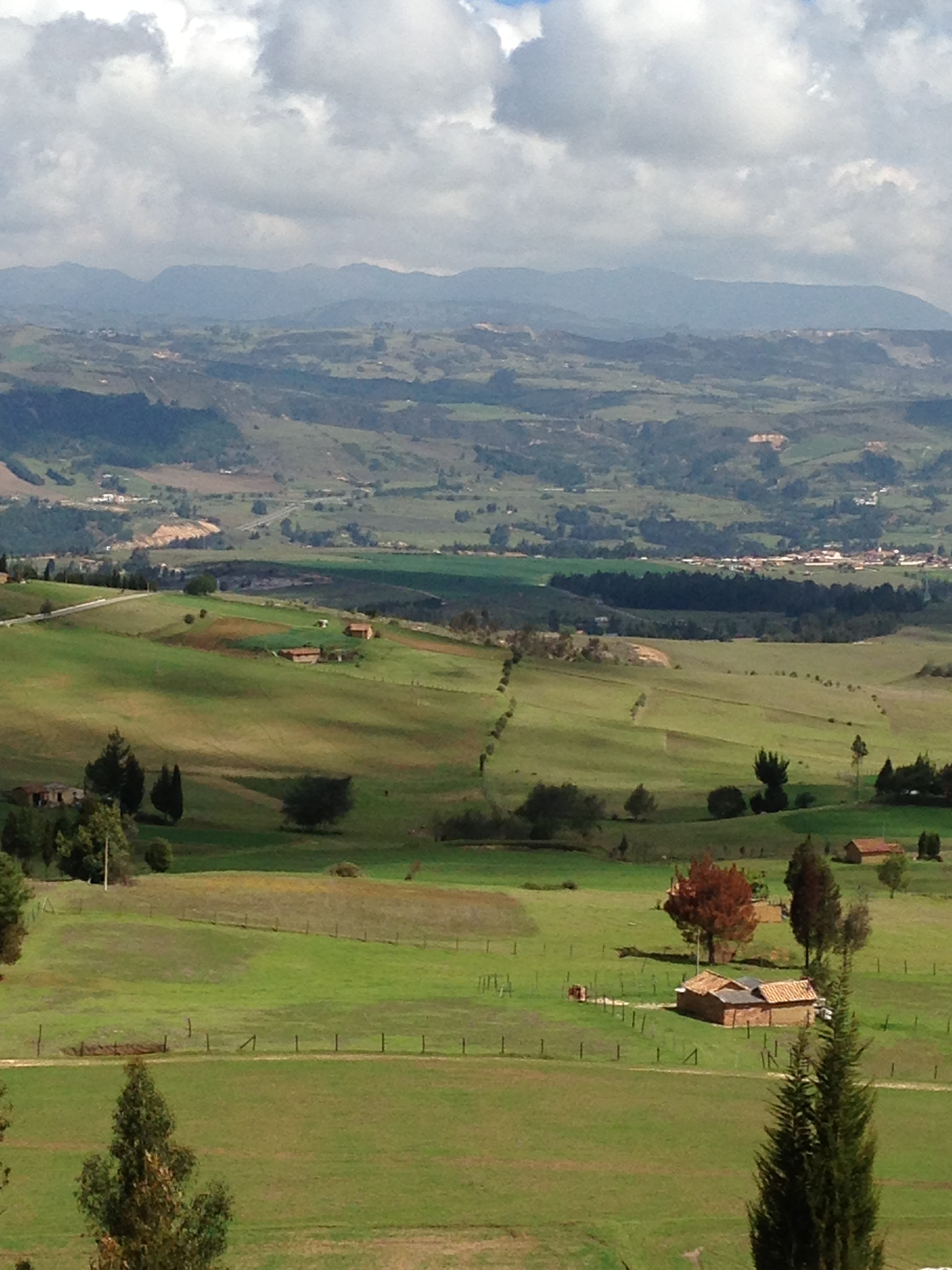
Chivatá means "our outside crop fields" in Muysccubun

The Muisca agriculture describes the agriculture of the Muisca, the advanced civilisation that was present in the times before the Spanish conquest on the high plateau in the Colombian Andes; the Altiplano Cundiboyacense. The Muisca were a predominantly agricultural society with small-scale farmfields, part of more extensive terrains. To diversify their diet, they traded mantles, gold, emeralds and salt for fruits, vegetables, coca, yopo and cotton cultivated in lower altitude warmer terrains populated by their neighbours, the Muzo, Panche, Guane, Guayupe, Lache, Sutagao and U'wa. Trade of products grown farther away happened with the Calima, Pijao and Caribbean coastal communities around the Sierra Nevada de Santa Marta.

Important scholars who have contributed to the knowledge about the Muisca agriculture have been Pedro Simón, Marianne Cardale de Schrimpff, Carl Henrik Langebaek and Sylvia Broadbent.

== Background ==
The central highlands of the Colombian Andes show evidence of population since 12,400 years BP at various archaeological sites such as El Abra, Tequendama and Tibitó. The prehistorical period is called Preceramic and lasted from 11,000 to 7000 years BP. This was followed by the Archaic period until 3000 BP (1000 BCE). Some of the earliest evidence of agriculture in South America is found in Colombia, dated at 4000 to 3000 BCE. Around this time, archaeological evidence shows the previous hunter-gatherer-based people left their rock shelters and started to live on the open plains of the Altiplano Cundiboyacense, especially the southern part, the Bogotá savanna.

Between ca. 1500 to 1000 BCE, the increase in d13C in Muisca human remains analysed indicate a diet that was richer in maize and as of 1000 BCE maize dominated the Muisca diet. Analysis of C4 by the Groningen University revealed that the cultivation of maize took a leap around 750-800 BCE, the most accepted start of the Herrera Period. During the Early Herrera, around 500 BCE, the use of ceramics became widespread in the area. It is theorized that those developments happened because of the migration of people from other areas.

From approximately 800 AD, the Herrera Period was followed by the Early Muisca Period that lasted until 1200. From 1200 until the conquest of the Spanish, the time is called Late Muisca. The difference between the Early and Late Muisca Periods mainly lies in the organization of the chiefdoms (cacicazgos) and the population growth. During the Late Muisca Period, the people were organized in a loose confederation of different rulers. The main rulers were the zipa based in Bacatá and the zaque who was seated in Hunza. The northernmost parts of the Muisca Confederation were ruled by the Tundama in Tundama and the holy iraca based in the sacred City of the Sun Suamox. Apart from that, different caciques were the heads of smaller villages of bohíos in other parts of the Muisca territories.

== Agriculture ==
The Muisca, living on the Altiplano Cundiboyacense, were mainly concentrated on the plains and in the valleys, comprising 12% of the Muisca territory, with minor communities in the higher terrains and slopes of the mountains. As the valleys, especially the Bogotá savanna were part of an ancient lake, Lake Humboldt, the soil was very fertile allowing for a variety of crops to be cultivated.

The agriculture of the Muisca was performed on small-scale cropfields, part of more extensive lands, and in a rather egalitarian manner; the higher social classes did not have access to more agricultural products than the lower class Muisca. Their main difference was in the construction of their houses and access to meat.

The predominant agricultural product of the Muisca was maize and they had numerous words in their language, Muysccubun, for the plant, kernels and processing of it. Evidence for maize cultivation predates the Muisca; already in the Herrera Period maize cultivation has been identified based on pollen analysis. The cacicazgos were self-sufficient in their agricultural products and surpluses of maize (abitago) were traded for more tropical climate fruits such as pineapples, avocados and Ipomea batatas.

The Muisca used terraces for their agriculture on the often flooded highlands and a system of irrigation and drainage was developed. They cultivated their crops in rows of mounds.

The harvests and the cultivation of the crop fields was the task of men, while the women did the sowing. The Muisca believed the fertility of the women would be transferred to the crop fields. To increase the fertility of the cropfields, the farmers burned plants and spread the ash over their lands.

=== Colonial period ===
After the Spanish conquest, the reformation was not only political (encomenderos) and religious, through the many missionaries, but also on an agricultural level. The transition to a mixed agriculture with Old World crops was remarkably fast, mainly to do with the fertility of the lands of the Altiplano Cundiboyacense permitting European crops to grow there, while in the more tropical areas the soil was not so much suited for the foreign crops. In 1555, the Muisca of Toca were growing European crops as wheat and barley and sugarcane was grown in other areas.

=== Main crops cultivated ===
Apart from maize, the main plants to be cultivated were:

- Canna edulis or achira, one of the first plants cultivated in the Andes
- Arracacia xanthorrhiza or arracacha, ideally grown at altitudes of 1,800 metres (5,900 ft) and above
- Tropaeolum tuberosum or cubio, ideally grown at high altitudes exceeding 3,000 metres (9,800 ft)
- Oxalis tuberosa, although this root is not native to Colombia, it was used by pre-Columbian societies in Cundinamarca and Boyacá after being introduced from its place of origin in Peru, where the majority of varieties are found
- Ullucus tuberosum or ulluku
- Polymnia edulis
- Solanum tuberosum, Solanum colombianum, Solanum andigena, Solanum rybinii and Solanum boyacense
- Manihot esculenta or yuca, a very important tuber, cultivated as of 1120 BCE
- Ipomoea batatas, sweet potatoes, as evidenced from 3200 years before present in Zipacón
- Chenopodium quinoa, quinoa, originating from Peru, more than 5000 years before present
- Phaseolus vulgaris, common bean, first domesticated in Mexico, Central America, Peru and Colombia
- Arachis hypogaea, peanuts
- Curcubita maxima and Curcubita pepo, pumpkins, earliest evidence from Zipacón already 3860 BCE
- Physalis peruviana or uchuva, typical fruit of Colombia, grown at altitudes above 2,200 metres (7,200 ft)
- Solanum quitoense or lulo, the national fruit of Colombia
- Passiflora, a wide variety of passionfruits, such as P. mixta, P. cumablensis, P. antioquiensis and P. ambigua and the largest species P. quadrangularis
- Cyphomandra betacea, tree tomato
- Annona cherimola, A. muricata and A. squamosal
- Vaccinium meridionale
- Rubus glaucus, R. macrocarpus and R. adenotrichus

== Religion ==
In the Muisca religion, the god of fertility of the farmfields and the people was Chaquén. During times of sowing and harvest the people gathered to pay tribute to Chaquén. At these festivities, defined by the Muisca calendar, they drank chicha, an alcoholic beverage made from fermented maize and sugar.

== Toponyms ==
Many of the toponyms in the Muisca Confederation refer to the agriculture of the people. The Chibcha word tá, common in names of modern municipalities, means "farm field". Examples are the former capital of the southern Muisca; Bacatá (after which Bogotá is named), Chitaraque, Chivatá, Cucaita, Guayatá, Soatá, Socotá, Tota, Machetá, Manta, Quetame and Tabio, among others.

== See also ==
- Muisca economy
- Incan agriculture, agriculture in Mesoamerica
- Muisca cuisine
