= Marianne Cardale de Schrimpff =

Colombian anthropologist

Marianne Vere Cardale de Schrimpff
- Citizenship: Colombian
- Education: University of Edinburgh; University of Oxford
- Spouse: Rudolf Hermann Schrimpff Mampe †
- Children: Robert Schrimpff, Sebastián Schrimpff, Martin Schrimpff
- Scientific career
- Fields: Archaeology & anthropology of the Calima, Guane, Muisca and others
- Workplaces: Universidad de los Andes
- Thesis: Techniques of Hand-weavíng and allied arts in Colombia (1972)

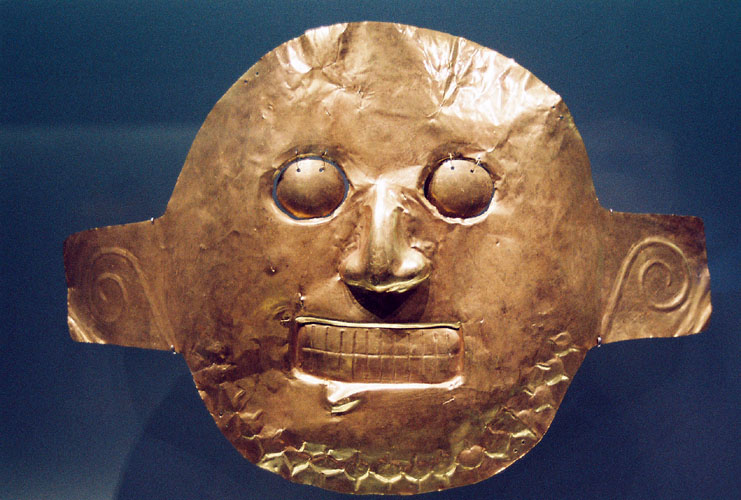
Mask of the Calima culture, extensively investigated by Cardale de Schrimpff

Marianne Vere Cardale de Schrimpff is a Colombian anthropologist, archaeologist, academic and writer.

== Biography ==
Marianne Cardale obtained her master's degree at the University of Edinburgh in 1965 and her PhD in 1972 at the University of Oxford with a thesis named Techniques of Hand-weavíng and allied arts in Colombia. From 1970 to 1974 she worked at the Universidad de Los Andes in Bogotá.

Cardale de Schrimpff has been active in the establishment of the Calima Gold Museum in Cali, in the region of the Calima. She also co-founded the Pro Calima group on the Calima culture. Part of her work was on the Malagana culture, about pre-Columbian roads, and other aspects of the Calima culture. Schrimpff has written about the Herrera Period, the Muisca people and their salt production in the Eastern Ranges of the Colombian Andes and about textiles in different parts of the country.

Cardale de Schrimpff has worked with other Muisca scholars and archaeologists in Colombia, including Sylvia Broadbent, Gonzalo Correal Urrego, Ana María Groot, and Leonor Herrera.

Cardale de Schrimpff speaks English, Spanish, French and German.

Her maiden name is Cardale, and "de Schrimpff" refers to her husband, aerial photographer Rudolf Schrimpff. He died on March 30, 2005, in an aviation accident.

== Works ==
Cardale de Schrimpff has published many books and articles about the Calima, Muisca, Panche, and other indigenous groups of Colombia, in Spanish and English.

=== Selected books ===
- 2015 - Archaeology of Salt, chapter Pre-Columbian Salt Production in Colombia - searching for the evidence
- 2000 - Caminos precolombinos: las vías, los ingenieros y los viajeros (with Leonor Herrera)
- 1996 - Caminos prehispánicos en Calima: El estudio de caminos precolombinos de la cuenca del alto río Calima, Cordillera Occidental, Valle del Cauca
- 1992 - Calima : diez mil años de historia en el suroccidente de Colombia
- 1981 - Las salinas de Zipaquirá: su explotación indígena

=== Selected articles ===
- 2013 - Human Occupation and the Environment during the Holocene in the River Cauca Valley, Colombia. The Evidence from Paleobotany and from Soil Studies (with Neil Duncan, Ana María Groot, Pedro Botero, Alejandra Betancourt & Juan Carlos Berrio
- 2006 - Cazando animales en el bestiario cosmológico: el cocodrilo en el suroeste de Colombia y en regiones vecinas del Ecuador (800 A.C. a 500 D.C.)
- 2006 - Estudio de los restos humanos y de fauna del sitio arqueológico Hacienda Malagana (with Gonzalo Correal Urrego, Leonor Herrera & Carlos Armando Rodríguez)
- 1990 - La agricultura y el manejo de la tierra en tiempos prehispánicos
- 1989 - Ornamentos y máscaras de oro dela cultura Ilama, metalurgia del periodo formativo tardio en la cordillera occidental colombiana (with Warwick Bray, Leonor Herrera & Adriana Arias De Hassan)
- 1988 - Textiles arqueológicos del bajo rio San Jorge
- 1981 - Ocupaciones humanas en el Altiplano Cundiboyacense
- 1976 - Investigaciones arqueológicas en la zona de Pubenza, Tocaima, Cundinamarca
- 1974 - Mitología Cuna: Los Kalu según Don Alfonso Díaz Granadas (with Leonor Herrera)

=== Notable works ===
- Cardale de Schrimpff, Marianne (1985), En busca de los primeros agricultores del Altiplano Cundiboyacense - Searching for the first farmers of the Altiplano Cundiboyacense (PDF) (in Spanish), Bogotá, Colombia: Banco de la República, pp. 99–125
- Paepe, Paul de; Cardale de Schrimpff, Marianne (1990), "Resultados de un estodio petrológico de cerámicas del Periodo Herrera provenientes de la Sabana de Bogotá y sus implicaciones arqueológicas - Results of a petrological study of ceramics form the Herrera Period coming from the Bogotá savanna and its archaeological implications", Boletín Museo del Oro (in Spanish), Museo del Oro: 99–119

== See also ==
- List of Muisca scholars
- Muisca
- Muisca agriculture
- Calima culture
