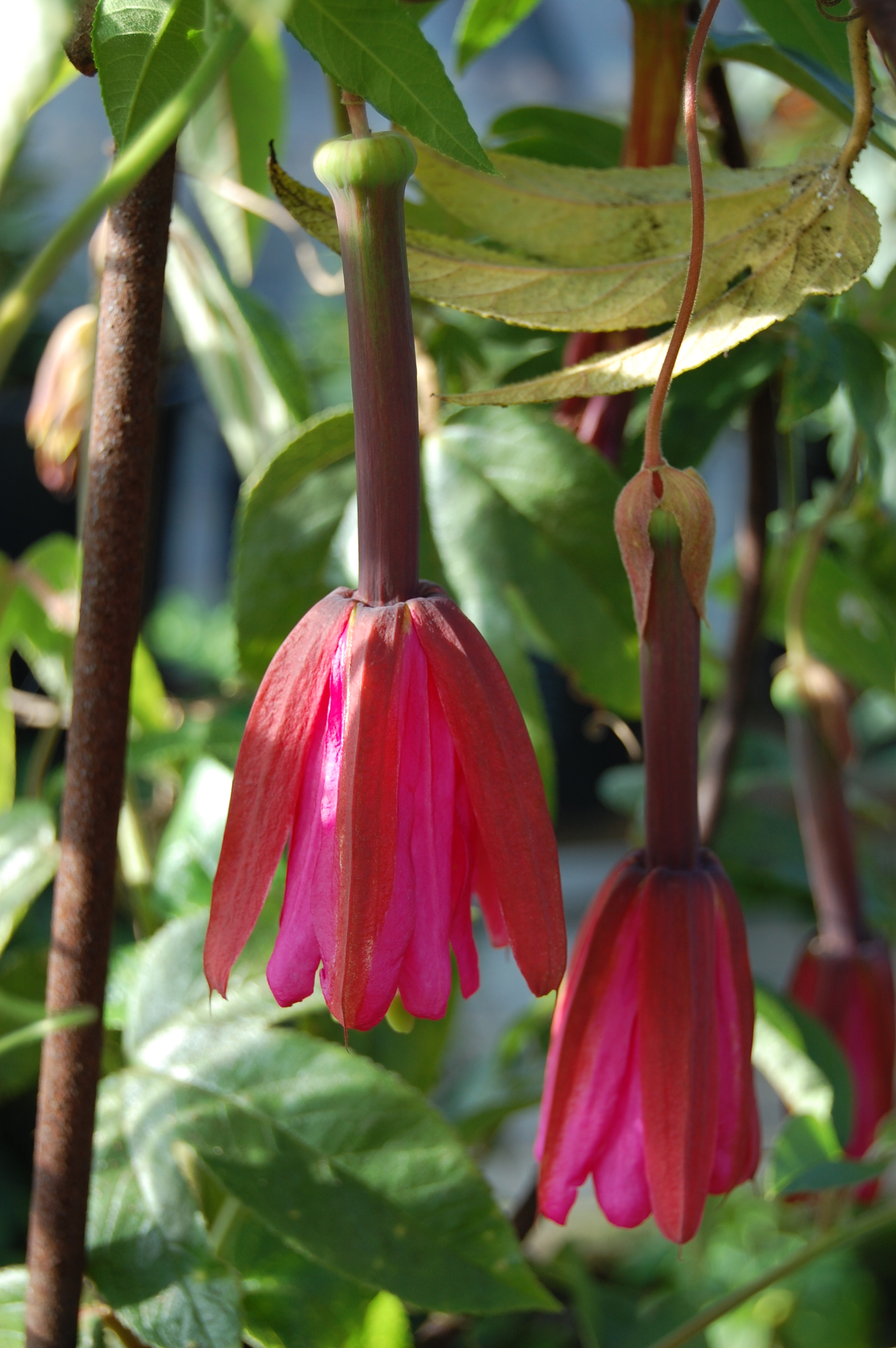

Scientific classification
- Kingdom: Plantae
- Clade: Tracheophytes
- Clade: Angiosperms
- Clade: Eudicots
- Clade: Rosids
- Order: Malpighiales
- Family: Passifloraceae
- Genus: Passiflora
- Species: P. × exoniensis

Binomial name
- Passiflora × exoniensis (R.T.Veitch ex Mast.) L.H.Bailey

= Passiflora × exoniensis =

Species of vine

Passiflora × exoniensis, the Exeter passion flower, is a hybrid of garden origin between two species of flowering plants, Passiflora antioquiensis × Passiflora tripartita var. mollissima in the family Passifloraceae. It was hybridised in the Veitch Nurseries in Exeter, Devon, England, in the 1870s. The name Passiflora × exoniensis has yet to be resolved as a correct scientific name; nevertheless it is widely found in the horticultural literature.

It is a robust evergreen climber growing to at least 6 m (20 ft) with three-lobed leaves and pendent deep pink tubular flowers followed by egg-shaped yellow fruits. It is hardy down to about −1 °C (30 °F) so may be grown outdoors with shelter in mild temperate areas; alternatively under glass, for instance in an unheated greenhouse.

Passiflora × exoniensis has won the Royal Horticultural Society's Award of Garden Merit.
