= Ana María Groot =

Colombian historian, archaeologist, anthropologist (born 1952)

Dr. Ana María Groot de Mahecha
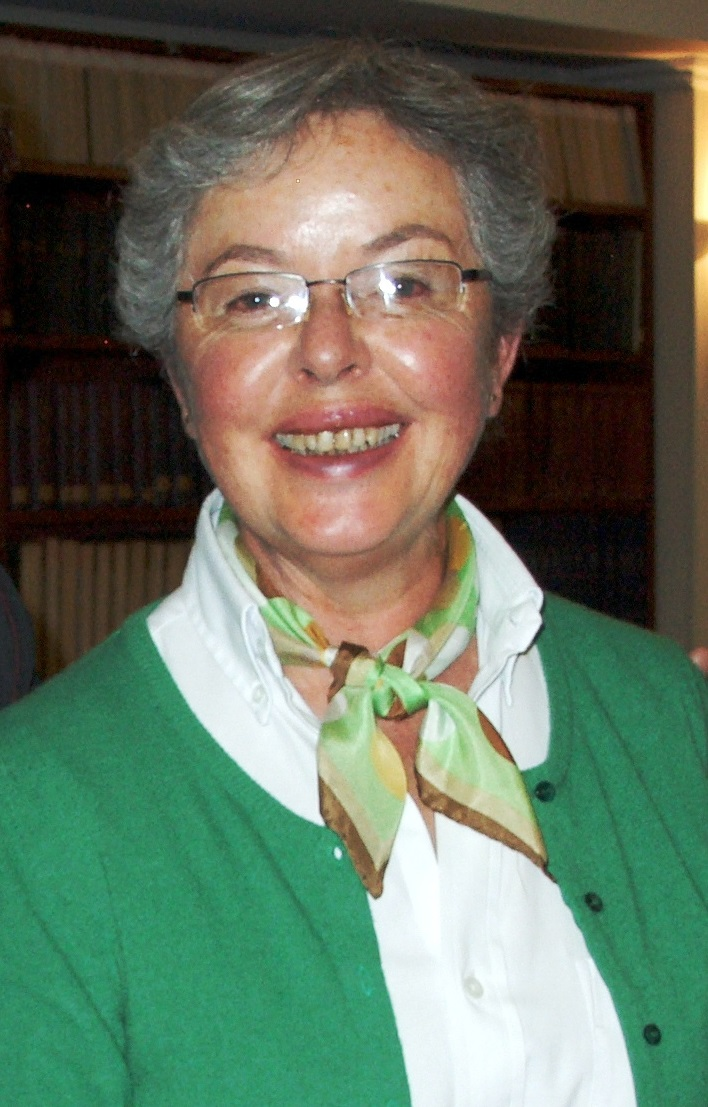
- Groot in 2015
- Born: 29 August 1951 (age 75); Bogotá, Colombia
- Education: Universidad de los Andes
- Known for: Archaeology, anthropology of indigenous Colombian peoples
- Scientific career
- Fields: History, archaeology, anthropology, Muisca women
- Workplaces: Universidad Nacional de Colombia
- Thesis: Trabajo y vida cotidiana en los pueblos productores de sal en el altiplano de Bogotá, siglos XVI-XVII (2008)

Ana María Groot de Mahecha (born 29 August 1952 in Bogotá) is a Colombian historian, archaeologist, anthropologist and associate professor at the Department of Anthropology of the Universidad Nacional de Colombia. Ana Mariá Groot speaks Spanish, English and French.

== Biography ==
Ana María Groot de Mahecha (other sources give second last name Sáenz) was born in Bogotá on 29 August 1952. She attended the Colegio Santa Francisca Romana and studied anthropology at the Universidad de los Andes, obtaining her MSc. title in 1974 with a thesis named Excavaciones Arqueológicas en Tierradentro. Estudio sobre cerámica y su posible uso en la elaboración de la sal ("Archaeological excavations in Tierradentro. Study about ceramics and its possible use in the elaboration of salt"). In 2008 Ana María Groot obtained her PhD degree in history of the Universidad Nacional de Colombia with a thesis named Trabajo y vida cotidiana en los pueblos productores de sal en el altiplano de Bogotá, siglos XVI-XVII ("Daily work and life of the salt producing peoples on the Bogotá plateau, 16th-17th centuries").

Groot has published on the archaeology and anthropology of pre-Columbian indigenous cultures such as Tierradentro, San Agustín, Nariño, Tairona and the Muisca, predominantly about their use of salt from the mines of Nemocón and Zipaquirá.

== Selected works ==
=== Books ===
- 2008 – Sal y poder en el altiplano de Bogotá, 1537-1640
- 2006 – Arqueologia y patrimonio : conocimiento y apropiacion social
- 1992 – Checua: Una secuencia cultural entre 8500 y 3000 años antes del presente
- 1991 – Intento de delimitación del territorio de los grupos étnicos pastos y quillacingas en el altiplano nariñense
- 1989 - Colombia prehispánica: regiones arqueológicas; chapters I, VIII, IX

=== Articles ===
- 2014 - Apropiación social del patrimonio arqueológico del municipio de Nemocón, Cundinamarca: un camino entre la ciencia, la sociedad y la política
- 2012 - Una historia de vida entre el pasado y el presente de Colombia: Homenaje a Alicia Dussán de Reichel-Dolmatoff
- 2006 - Paisajes arqueológicos relacionados con el camino principal andino (Qhapaq Ñan)
- 2000 - Dieta y bioantropología de los pobladores tempranos del valle medio del río Checua
- 2000 - Sal, caminos y mercaderes: el caso de los muiscas en el siglo XVI
- 2000 - Caminos Precolombinos: las vías, los ingenieros y los viajeros
- 1999 - Las Salinas de Zipaquirá
- 1990 - Excavaciones arqueológicas en el municipio de Nemocón
- 1988 – Las Federaciones de aldeas: el caso de los muiscas y de los taironas
- 1986 - Generalidades sobre el poblamiento prehispánico del Parque Nacional Natural Tairona
- 1983 - Ciudad Perdida: Una población serrana de los taironas

=== Lectures ===
- 2015 - La mita salinera en el Nuevo Reino de Granada y el rol de las mujeres: el caso de los muiscas en el altiplano de Bogotá

== See also ==
- List of Muisca scholars
- Muisca, salt mining
- Muisca women, Nemocón, Zipaquirá, Checua

== Notable works by Groot ==
- Groot de Mahecha, Ana María (2014) [2008], Sal y poder en el altiplano de Bogotá, 1537-1640 (in Spanish), Universidad Nacional de Colombia, pp. 1–174, ISBN 978-958-719-046-5
- Groot de Mahecha, Ana María (2012), "Una historia de vida entre el pasado y el presente de Colombia: Homenaje a Alicia Dussán de Reichel-Dolmatoff - A history of life between the past and the present of Colombia: hommage to Alicia Dussán de Reichel-Dolmatoff" (PDF), Maguaré (in Spanish), 26, Universidad Nacional de Colombia: 335–338, ISSN 0120-3045
- Groot de Mahecha, Ana María (1992), Checua: Una secuencia cultural entre 8500 y 3000 años antes del presente - Checua: a cultural sequence between 8500 and 3000 years before present, Banco de la República, pp. 1–95

== Bibliography ==
- Olivos Lombana, Andrés (2006), Historia de Tocancipá: olleros y sembradores - History of Tocancipá: pot makers and sowers (PDF) (in Spanish), Tocancipá, Colombia: Alcaldía Municipal de Tocancipá, pp. 1–244
- Pinto Nolla, María (2003), Galindo, un sitio a cielo abierto de cazadores/recolectores en la Sábana de Bogotá (Colombia) - Galindo, an open air site of hunters/gatherers on the Bogotá savanna (Colombia) (in Spanish), Bogotá, Colombia: Banco de la República, pp. 1–41
