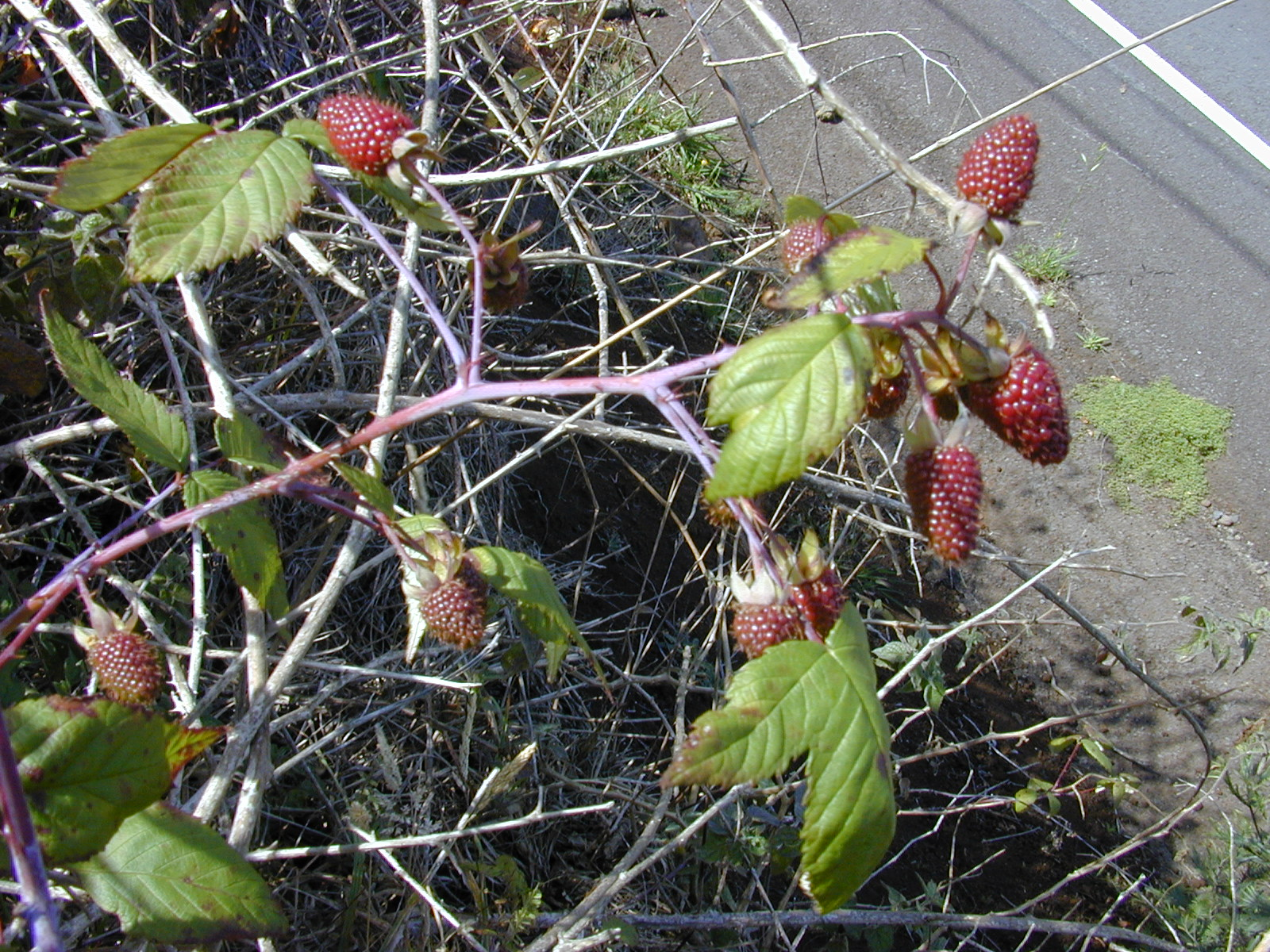

Scientific classification
- Kingdom: Plantae
- Clade: Tracheophytes
- Clade: Angiosperms
- Clade: Eudicots
- Clade: Rosids
- Order: Rosales
- Family: Rosaceae
- Genus: Rubus
- Species: R. glaucus

Binomial name
- Rubus glaucus Benth. 1845 not Kretzer 1897

= Rubus glaucus =

Berry and plant

Rubus glaucus, commonly known as mora de Castilla or Andean raspberry, is a species of blackberry in the rose family. It is found in Latin America.

== Description ==
Rubus glaucus is a perennial semi-erect climbing shrub. It consists of several round and spiny stems that form the corona of the plant, 1 to 2 centimetres (1/2 to 3/4 in) in diameter, and can grow up to 3 metres (10 ft). The leaves are trifoliate with serrated edges, dark green and white beam beneath. Both stems and leaves are covered by a white powder.

The fruit is similar to a loganberry in terms of taste and utility. It is an ellipsoid compound drupe of 15 to 25 millimetres (5/8 to 1 in) at its widest diameter, weighing 3–5 grams, green when formed, becoming red when ripe and then dark and bright purple. It consists of small drupes attached to the receptacle when ripe and fleshy whitish rich in vitamin C, calcium and phosphorus, bittersweet, and suitable for juices, nectars, jams, jellies, ice cream, pastries and confectionery. Fruit production is continuous with two annual peaks. Plants reach maturity and produce fruit after the first year extending through the rest of the plant's life which can be 12 to 20 years.

=== Similar species ===
- Rubus adenotrichos (Schltdl. 1839) wild blackberry
- Rubus bogotensis (Kunth, 1824) Black mulberry
- Rubus giganteus (Benth. 1846) Cat blackberry or Moor blackberry
- Rubus megalococcus (Focke, 1874) Small mora
- Rubus nubigenus (Kunth, 1824) Large mora

== Distribution and habitat ==
The plant is found in Latin America from Mexico to Bolivia, including the northern and central Andes. It is native to tropical highlands of northwestern South America and Central America. In Costa Rica it is found in the upper part of the Cordillera de Talamanca and the central volcanic cordillera.

It grows best at temperatures between 12 and 19 °C (54 and 66 °F), with relative humidity of 80 to 90%, high sunshine and well-distributed rainfall between 800 and 2,500 mm (31 and 98 in) a year. It prefers elevations between 1,500 and 3,100 m (4,900 and 10,200 ft).
