= Calima culture =

Archaeological culture of western Colombia

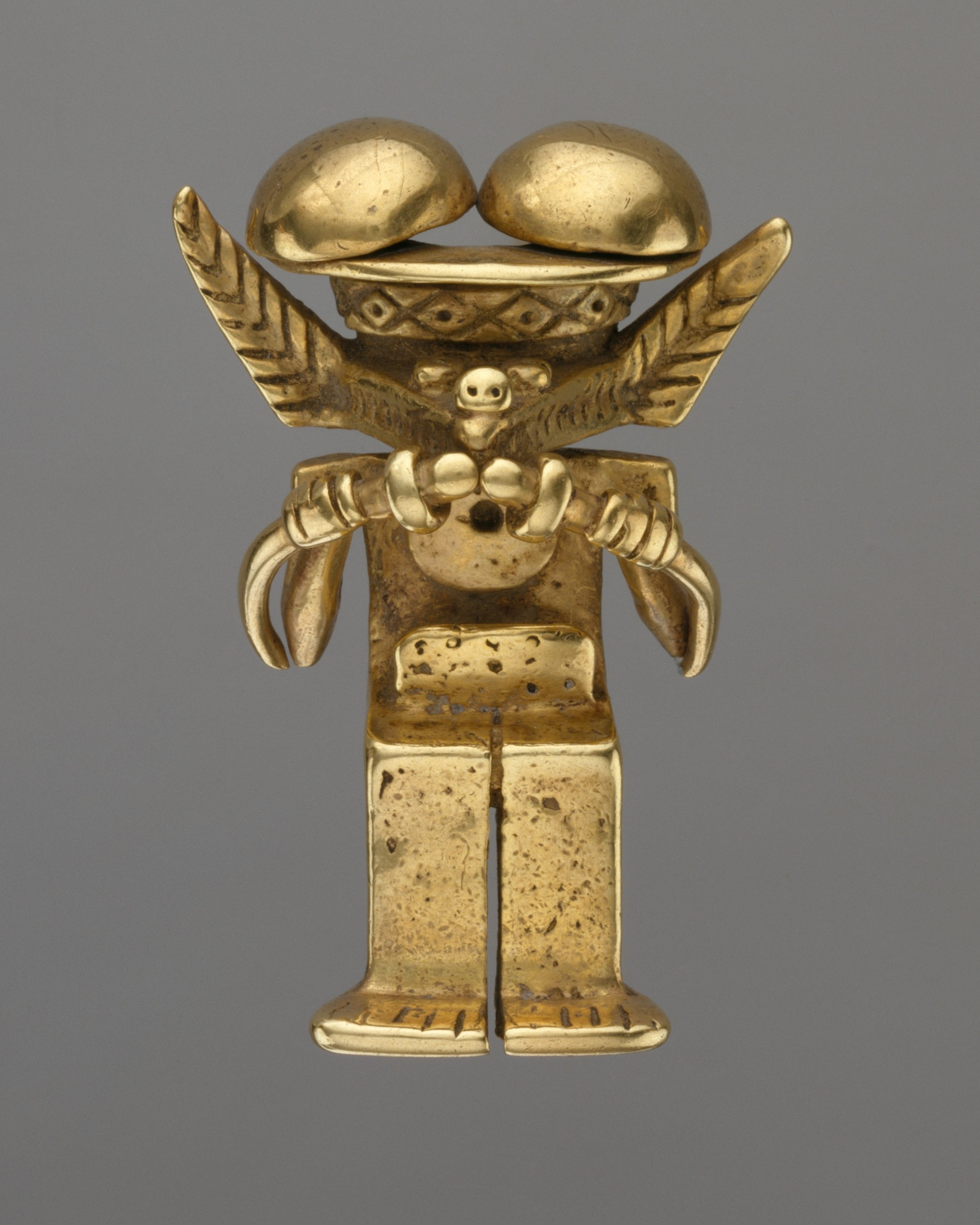
Calima-Yotoco animal-headed figure pendant, Metropolitan Museum, NYC

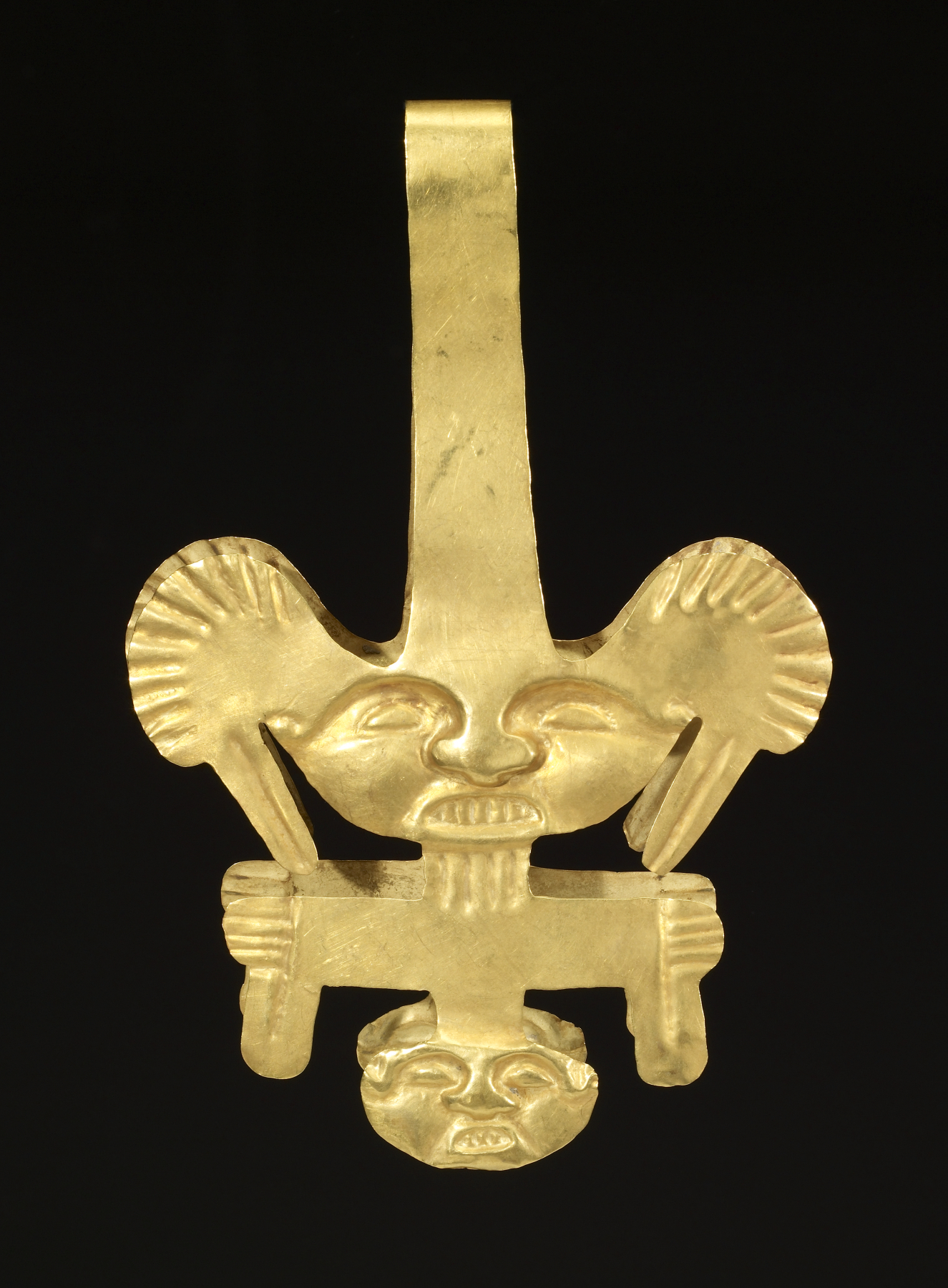
Calima culture gold ceremonial tweezers from Walters Art Museum

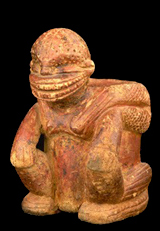
Calima culture sculpture, Gold Museum, Bogotá, Colombia

Calima culture (200 BCE–400 CE) is a series of pre-Columbian cultures from the Valle del Cauca in Colombia.

The four societies that successively occupied the valley and make up Calima culture are the Ilama, Yotoco, Sonso, and Malagana cultures.

The Calima Darién Archaeological Museum and the Calima Gold Museum feature artifacts from the Calima culture.

== Ilama culture ==
By 1500 BCE the Ilama culture, the first Agricultural-Pottery society, appeared along the Calima River, near the present day towns of Restrepo and Darien. Its society had a social structure of Cacicazgos (chiefdoms) that prevailed until the arrival of the Spaniards. The economy of Ilama was based on textile weaving, metallurgy, hunting, fishing, and agriculture. Yuca and beans were primary crops. The Chief or Cacique was the leader of the settlement. Other occupations were shamans, warriors, farmers, hunters, pottery men, and goldsmiths. Their ceramics were typically red and black, featuring religious imagery.

== Yotoco culture ==
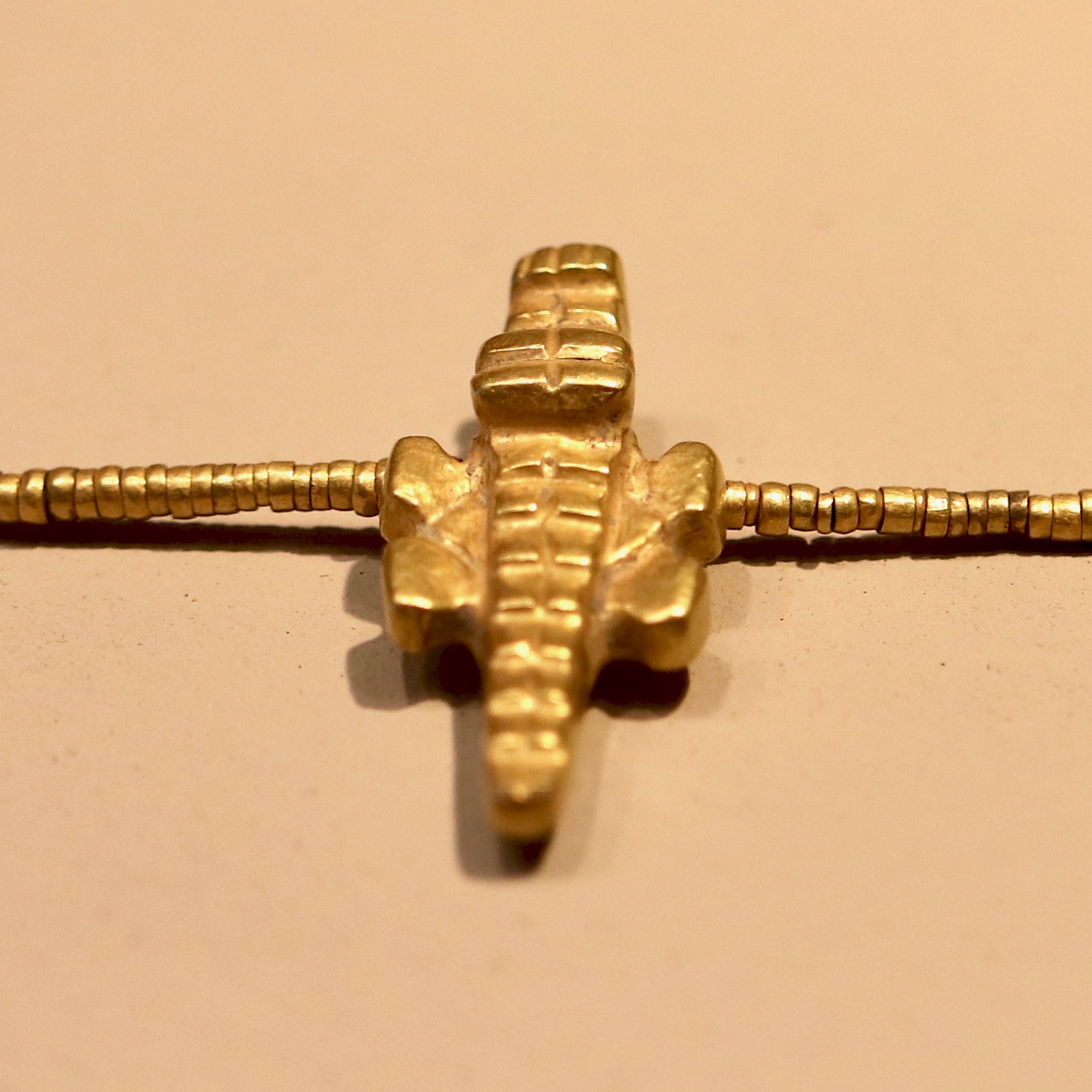
Calima alligator pendant, San Antonio Museum of Art

By 100 CE the Ilamas developed into the Yotoco Culture, which expanded their territory further into the Cauca River and the Pacific Ocean and to the south to the region of what is now the city of Cali.

The Yotocos prevailed in the region until 1200 CE and were a highly stratified society headed by caciques, which managed several settlements. The population had increased, forcing them to develop effective agricultural techniques to feed its population which also improved the techniques on pottery and metal works. They created polychrome ceramics and introduction of hammered goldware. The agriculture of the Yotocos was more varied than that of the Ilamas and was based on maize, yuca, beans, arracacha, achiote among others. The Yotoco started declining in the 6th century CE.

== Sonso culture ==
Sonso culture (800–1600 CE) flourished during the Late Period I. Population increased, government became more centralized. Sonso culture was marked by fewer ceramic styles, and their goldware was mixed with copper and cast.

== Malagana culture ==
The primary archaeological site for Malagana culture is Malagana. Dating from 300 BCE to 300 CE, the site was discovered in 1992, and an estimated four tons of artifacts were looted from it in a matter of days. This culture produced fine, burnished ceramics, predominantly white or terra cotta in color. Ocarinas, large bottles, alcarrazas, double spout and bridge vessels, become common.
