= Calima Gold Museum =

- Museo del Oro Calima
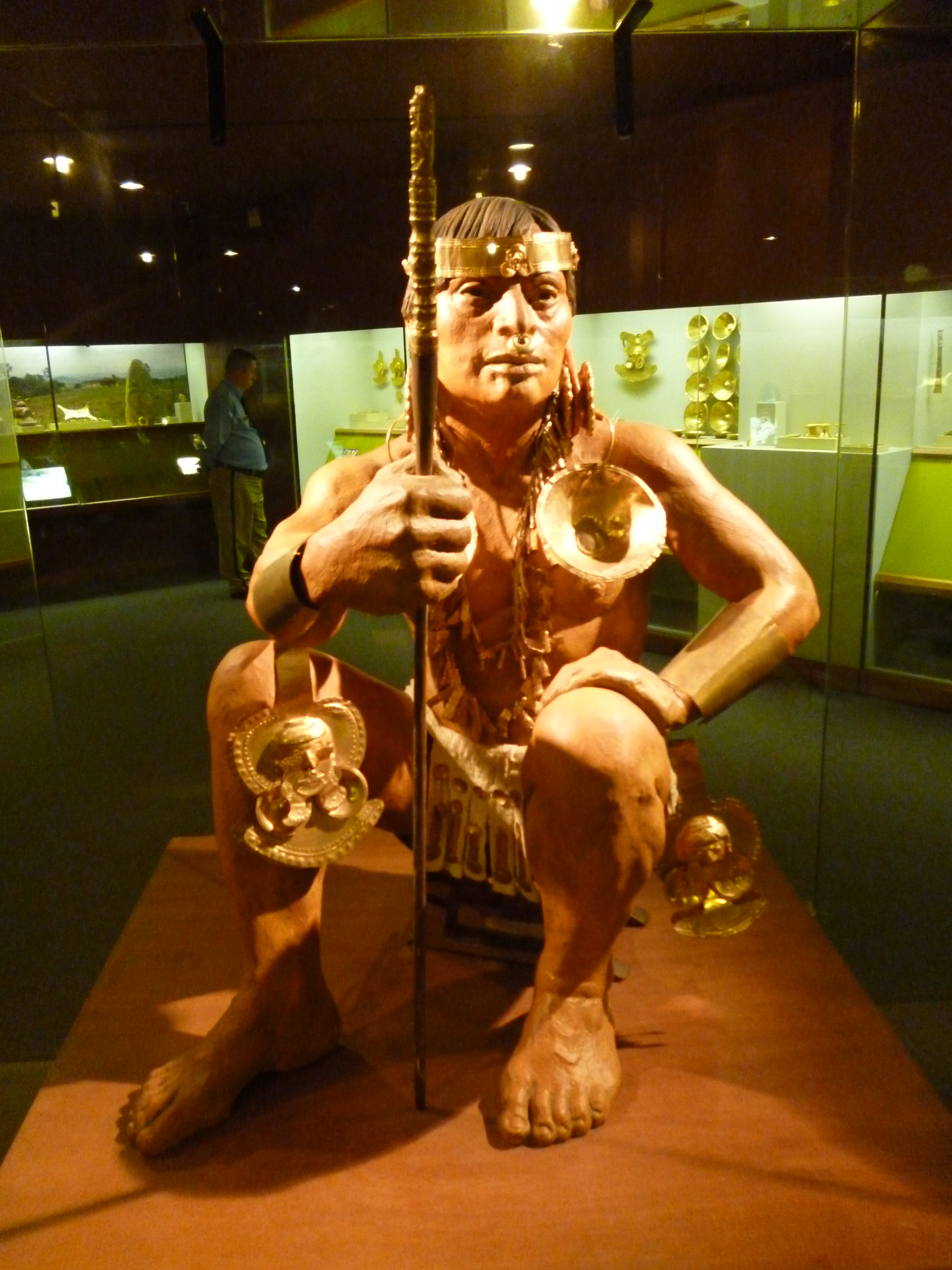
- Established: 9 May 1991
- Location: Cali, Colombia
- Coordinates: 3.4500°N 76.5357°W
- Type: Archaeological museum
- Collections: Pre-Columbian
- Collection size: 615
- Director: Óscar Dorado
- Owner: Bank of the Republic of Colombia
- Website: www.banrepcultural.org/cali/museo-del-oro-calima

The Calima Gold Museum is an archaeological museum dedicated to the Calima culture located in the historic center of Santiago de Cali, Colombia. The Calima Gold Museum was the ninth museum created by the Bank of the Republic of Colombia in order to show the artistic and cultural expressions of the pre-Hispanic populations. It is also one of the Bank's six gold museums located throughout Colombia, their main one being the Gold Museum in Bogotá.

The museum contains 615 pre-Hispanic objects of gold, ceramic, stone, wood, shell, and other materials created by the Llama, Yotoco and Sonso societies, which historically lived in the region. Archeological pieces created by a fourth society known as the Malagana can be found in the Gold Museum in Bogotá. These pieces were not included in this museum due to storage limitations.

Admission to the one room museum is free for all visitors and it is open from Tuesday to Saturday. A guided tour option is available on request. The museum is located inside the Bank of the Republic building.

== Background ==
The museum was inaugurated on May 9, 1991 in order to conserve, investigate, and disseminate the archaeological heritage of the region, known under the generic name of Calima culture, and which refers to different human groups that inhabited the Valle del Cauca during different periods of time.

It is one of six gold museums owned and operated by the Colombian Bank of the Republic. The other five museums are in Armenia, Bogotá, Cartagena, Pasto, and Santa Marta.

== See also ==
- Gold Museum (Bogotá)
