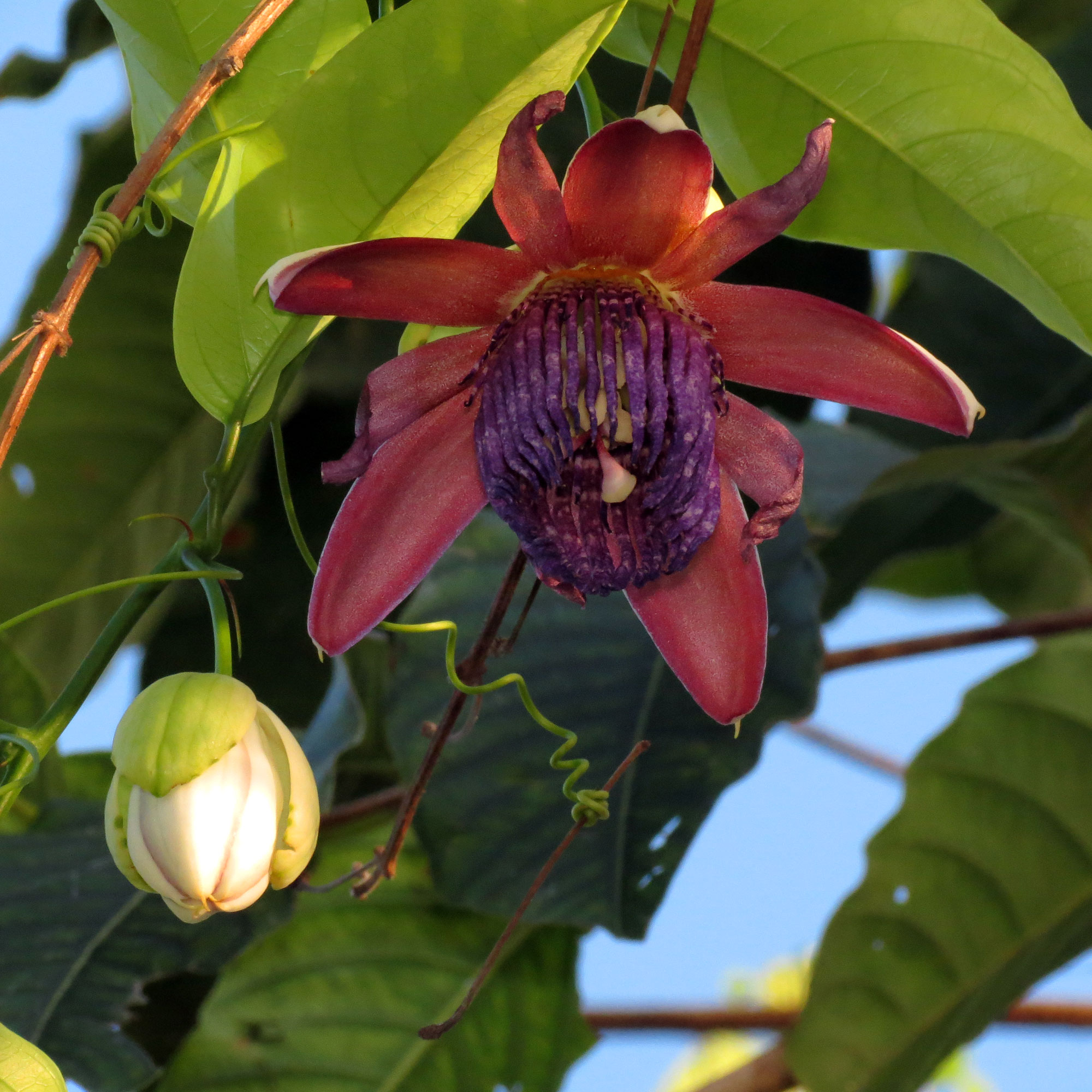

Scientific classification
- Kingdom: Plantae
- Clade: Tracheophytes
- Clade: Angiosperms
- Clade: Eudicots
- Clade: Rosids
- Order: Malpighiales
- Family: Passifloraceae
- Genus: Passiflora
- Species: P. ambigua

Binomial name
- Passiflora ambigua Hemsl.

Synonyms
- Passiflora emiliae Sacco

= Passiflora ambigua =

Species of vine

Passiflora ambigua is a species of flowering plant in the family Passifloraceae. It is found in Mexico, Belize, Costa Rica, and Colombia.
