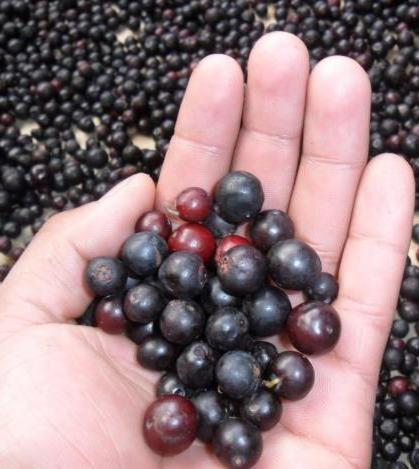

Conservation status
- Least Concern (IUCN 3.1)

Scientific classification
- Kingdom: Plantae
- Clade: Tracheophytes
- Clade: Angiosperms
- Clade: Eudicots
- Clade: Asterids
- Order: Ericales
- Family: Ericaceae
- Genus: Vaccinium
- Section: Vaccinium sect. Pyxothamnus
- Species: V. meridionale

Binomial name
- Vaccinium meridionale Sw.

Synonyms
- Metagonia meridionalis (Sw.) Nutt.; Vaccinium caracasanum Kunth

= Vaccinium meridionale =

Species of berry-producing shrub

Vaccinium meridionale, agraz or Andean blueberry, is a South American species in the section Pyxothamnus of the genus Vaccinium, part of the heath and heather family.

== Description ==
It is a shrub which measures from 1.5 to 7 metres (5 to 23 feet) in height. The leaves are simple, alternate, elliptical to oval in shape, coriaceous (leathery), with a sharp, slight apiculate apex, cuneate base and a crenate margin.

The flowers are tetramerous, or sometimes pentamerous, with a white corolla, possibly marked with pink or red. The inflorescence is racemic, producing 10 to 15 flowers per raceme. The fruits are round, approximately 1.2 centimetres (1/2 inch) in diameter, green during growth and dark red (giving the appearance of black or violet) upon reaching maturity, with an acidic taste.

== Distribution and habitat ==
It is found in the mountains of Colombia, Venezuela and Ecuador, and may have been introduced to Jamaica. Like so‑called wild blueberries in North America, it is artisanally tended in a manner that differs little from wild growing conditions, with few inputs. Its fruit is gathered in the wild and widely sold in local health food markets and grocery stores.

== Cultivation ==
It is planted in plots at distances of 3 by 2 metres (10 ft × 6 1/2 ft), without modifying its habitat since it is a wild species. The best propagation is obtained with seedlings with root buds from old lianas. As natural habitats disappear, there is a growing trend of cultivating wild vegetal species in seed banks.

When propagation is done using seeds, the seedlings can be transplanted after a year and a half; When stakes are used, the transplanting can be done at six months by the rooting of branches, or layering. The productive life of the plants can extend to up to eight decades, with two fruit harvests per year.

The successful conservation of the Agraz requires familiarity with its reproductive biology. This is a clonal plant that produces genetically identical individuals through vegetative reproduction, whose genetic structure is complex, with a mix of plants that arise from sexual and asexual reproduction; it is therefore advisable, in addition to field collection, to keep the seeds of a few plants, for greater representation of genetic variability. It is diploid, with a total of 48 chromosomes.

=== In Colombia ===
In Colombia, the presence of this plant has been recorded between altitudes of 2,200 and 3,400 metres (7,200 and 11,200 ft) above sea level, and it is the only tropical country that proffers two annual harvests of this fruit. A group of researchers from the UN in Medellin chose as field work crops present in the municipalities of Guachetá in Cundinamarca; California in Santander; and La Ceja, Santa Rosa de Osos and Entrerríos in northern Antioquia. This study determined that these red berries, which are often consumed in processed form, undergo changes during their stages of maturation that affect their antioxidant levels.
