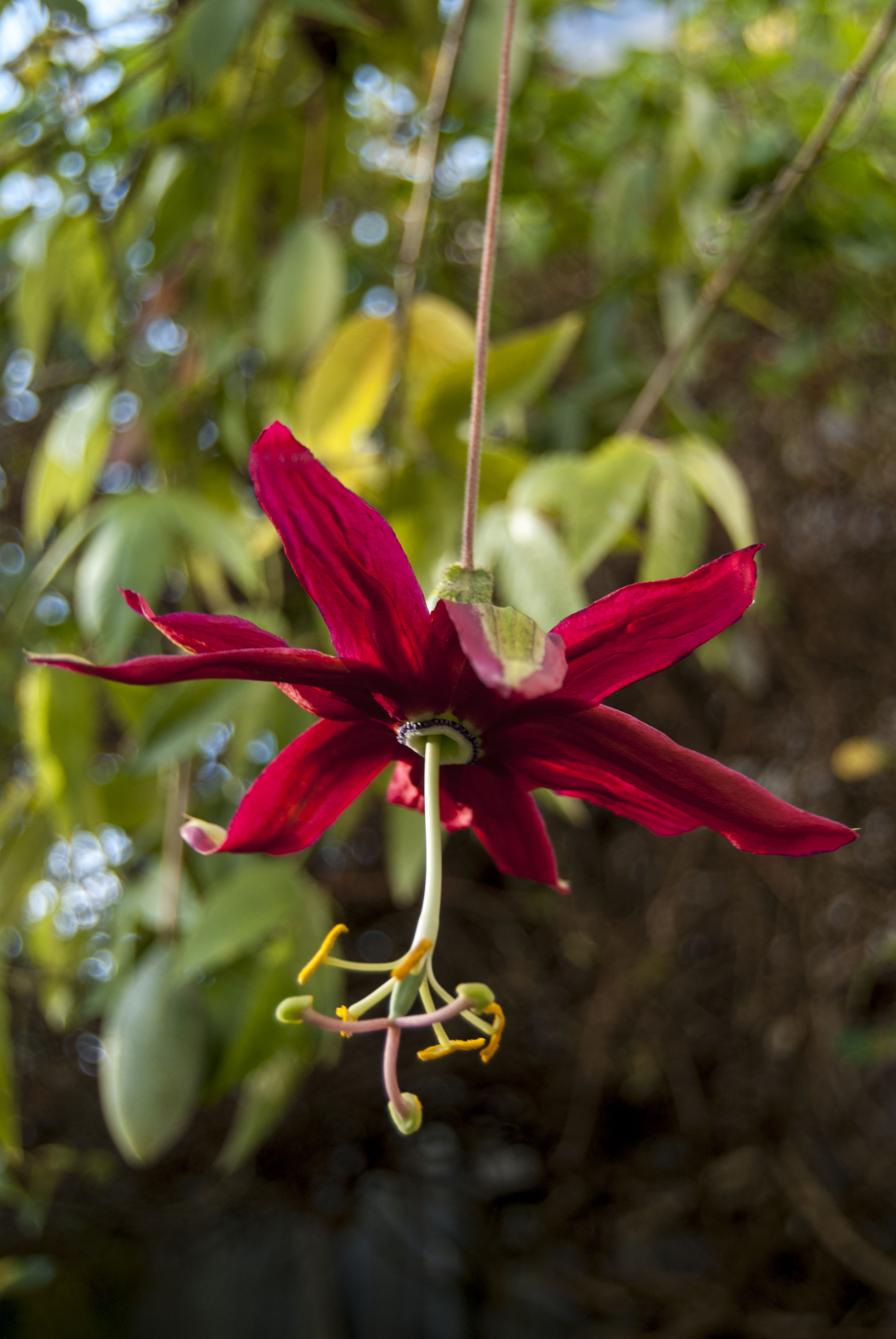
- Passiflora antioquiensis flower

Conservation status
- Least Concern (IUCN 3.1)

Scientific classification
- Kingdom: Plantae
- Clade: Tracheophytes
- Clade: Angiosperms
- Clade: Eudicots
- Clade: Rosids
- Order: Malpighiales
- Family: Passifloraceae
- Genus: Passiflora
- Species: P. antioquiensis

Binomial name
- Passiflora antioquiensis H.Karst.

Synonyms
- P. van–volxemii (Hook.) Triana & Planch.; Tacsonia van-volxemii Hook.

= Passiflora antioquiensis =

Species of vine

Passiflora antioquiensis, the red banana passionfruit, is a species of flowering plant in the family Passifloraceae. It is native to Colombia and is named for the Antioquia Department in Colombia where the type specimen was collected. It was originally described by Gustav Karl Wilhelm Hermann Karsten in 1859. It has gained the Royal Horticultural Society's Award of Garden Merit. With Passiflora tripartita var. mollissima it was hybridised in the Veitch Nurseries in Exeter, England in the 1870s to yield Passiflora × exoniensis, which has also gained the Award of Garden Merit.
