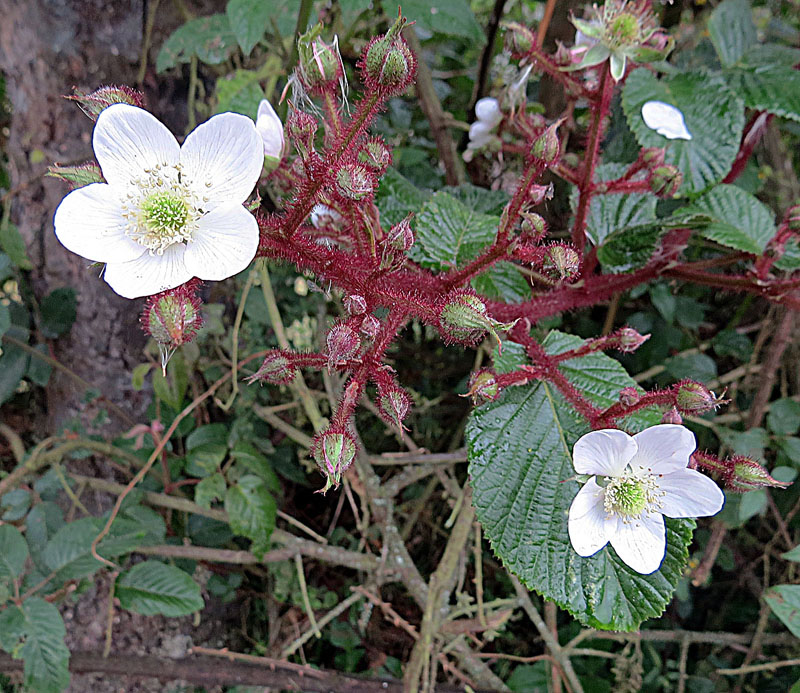

Scientific classification
- Kingdom: Plantae
- Clade: Tracheophytes
- Clade: Angiosperms
- Clade: Eudicots
- Clade: Rosids
- Order: Rosales
- Family: Rosaceae
- Genus: Rubus
- Species: R. adenotrichos

Binomial name
- Rubus adenotrichos Schltdl. 1839

Synonyms
- Rubus adenotrichus Schltdl.

= Rubus adenotrichos =

Species of fruit and plant

Rubus adenotrichos is a Mesoamerican species of bramble in the rose family.

The species forms a shrub up to 6 metres (20 feet) tall, with copious hairs and scattered curved prickles. The leaves are compound with 3 or 5 leaflets. The flowers are white or pink. The fruits are red or black.

It grows in Central America, northwestern South America, and central and southern Mexico, from Michoacán and Veracruz south to Ecuador and Venezuela.
