= List of reportedly haunted locations in Colombia =

There are numerous reportedly haunted places in Colombia. This list is alphabetized by province or territory.

== Antioquia ==
- University of Antioquia, Medellín Campus: The Paranymph at San Ignacio Building, which now houses the radio station, was employed by the Franciscan community to found the university on 1801. For a while it worked as a prison and then as a hospital. Workers from the radio station reported to hear bangings, footsteps or moans. The ghost of a monk have been seen, probably the spirit of one of the first rectors, Fray Rafael de La Serna. Also, in the Faculty of Medicine, surveillance reports of lights turning on and off with no explanation

== Bogotá ==
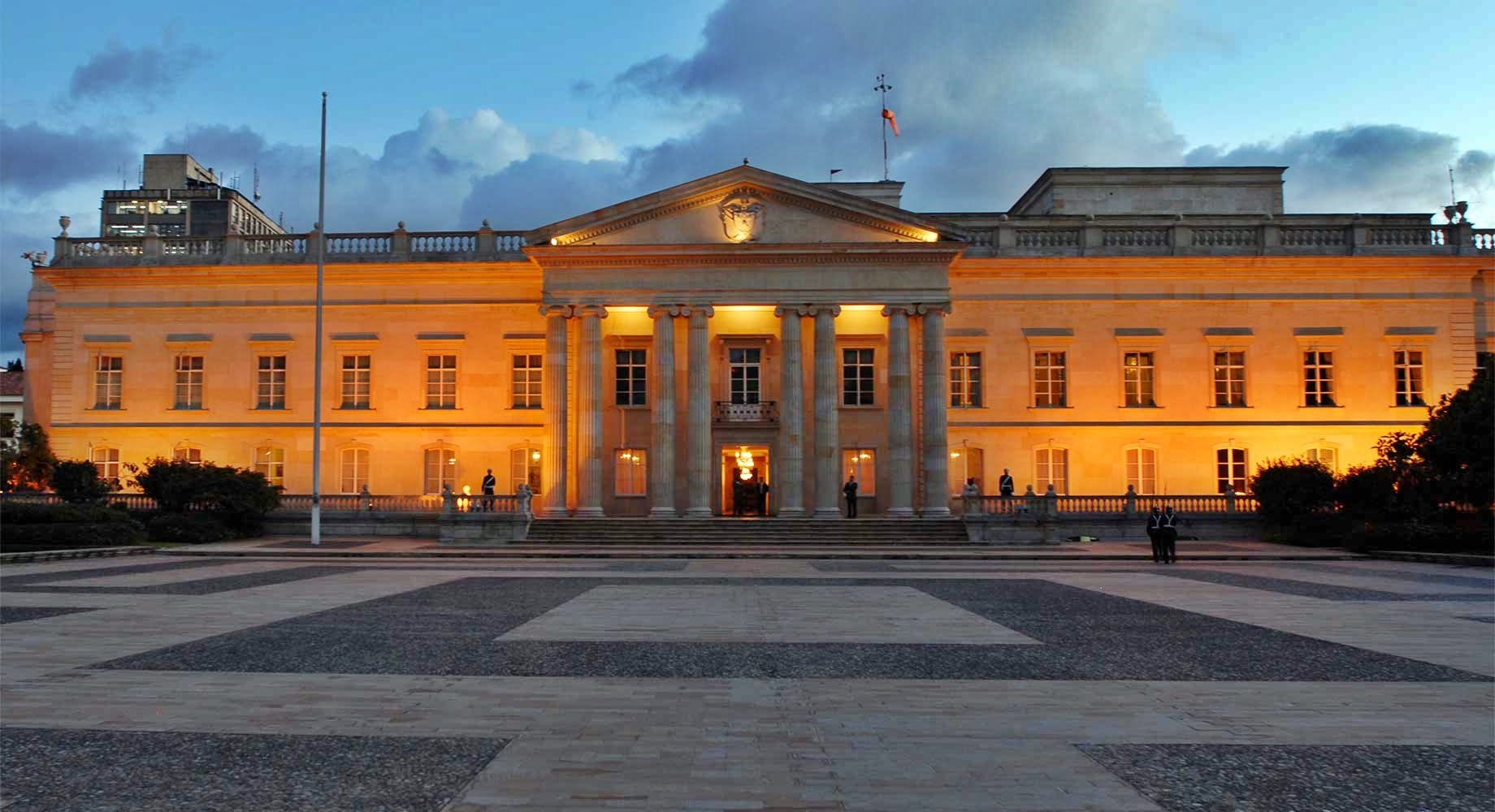
Palacio de Nariño

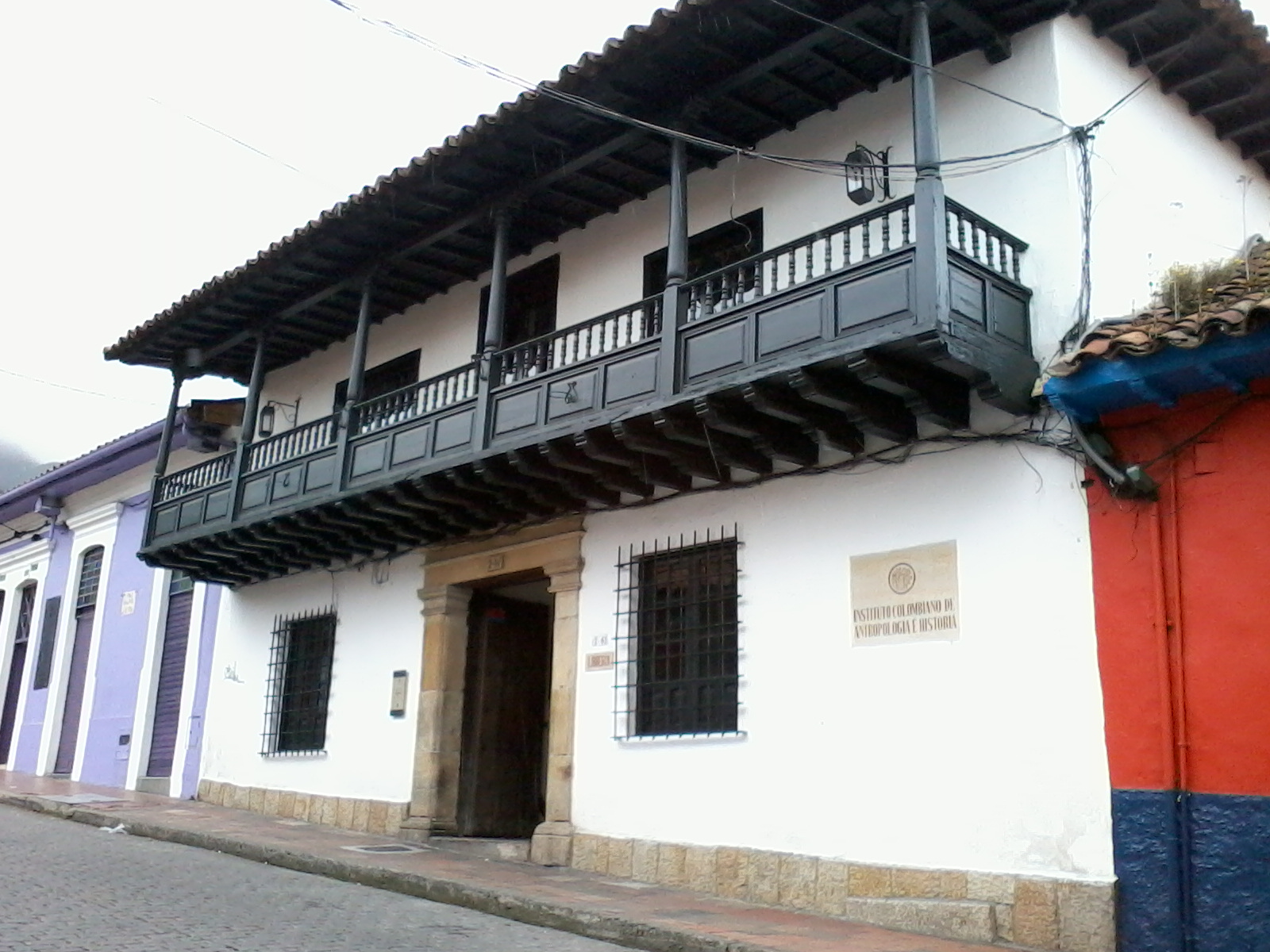
ICANH

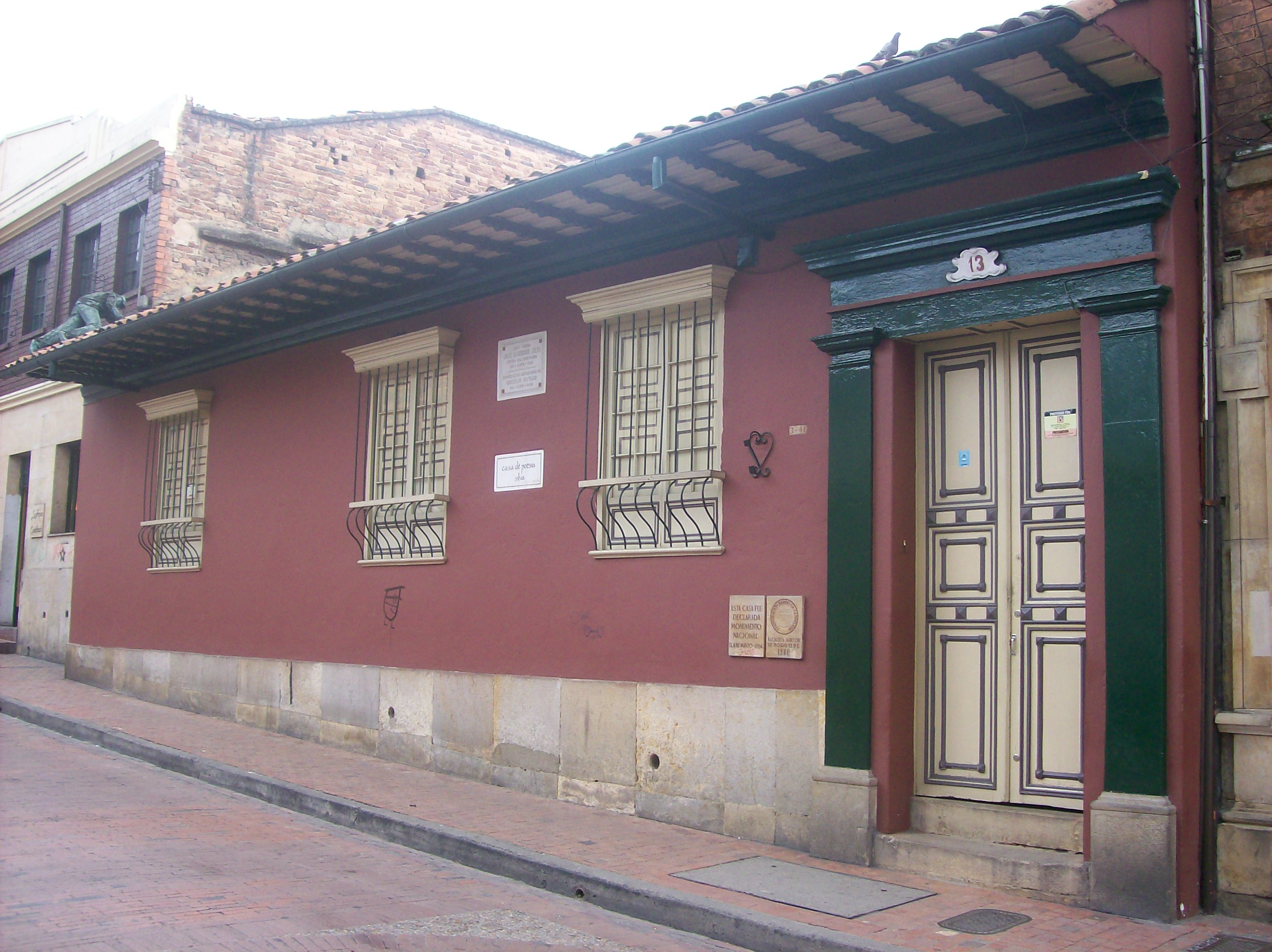
Silva House of Poetry
- Palacio de Nariño: Paranormal activity has been reported specially in the Former Presidents' Hall. Sorcery and witchcraft has been practiced inside the building.
- The house where La Estrategia del Caracol was filmed is located next to Palacio de Nariño. The children from the last family who own the house tell that they refuse to play in ground floor since they saw a ghost walking down the stairs. Bangs, sounds of heavy things falling, silhouettes and shadows are other phenomena reported.
- Bolívar Square: José Raimundo Russi was executed here, and his ghost haunts the square.
- The Colombian Institute of Anthropology and History headquarters
- Manuelita Sáenz House
- The Silva Poetry House
- San Juan De Dios Hospital: A singing nurse, a nun, and some moanings have been reported where the morgue and the maternity wing used to be located.
- La Sabana Railway Station: Stories of spirits of kids playing inside and a tortured woman who was killed there.
- Jorge Eliécer Gaitán Theatre: Built in 1938, its story is full of events of cultural, social and political importance. Lights that switch on and off, children's shadows, and the ghost of a builder are some of the phenomena that had scared the surveillants.
- National Museum of Colombia: It was primarily used as a jail shaped as a panopticon, and was one of the main national prisons in Colombia during its first years as a Republic. The awful conditions lived by prisoners inside led some of them to perish and their souls still roam the halls of the building.
- Hospital Universitario San Ignacio: Built inside Pontificia Universidad Javeriana, is haunted by the ghost of a tall doctor who still makes rounds.
- Central Cemetery of Bogotá: Probably the most important cemetery of the nation, due to the many historical figures that are buried inside. It is also one of the most haunted places in the country, full of stories of sorcery, miracles and apparitions.
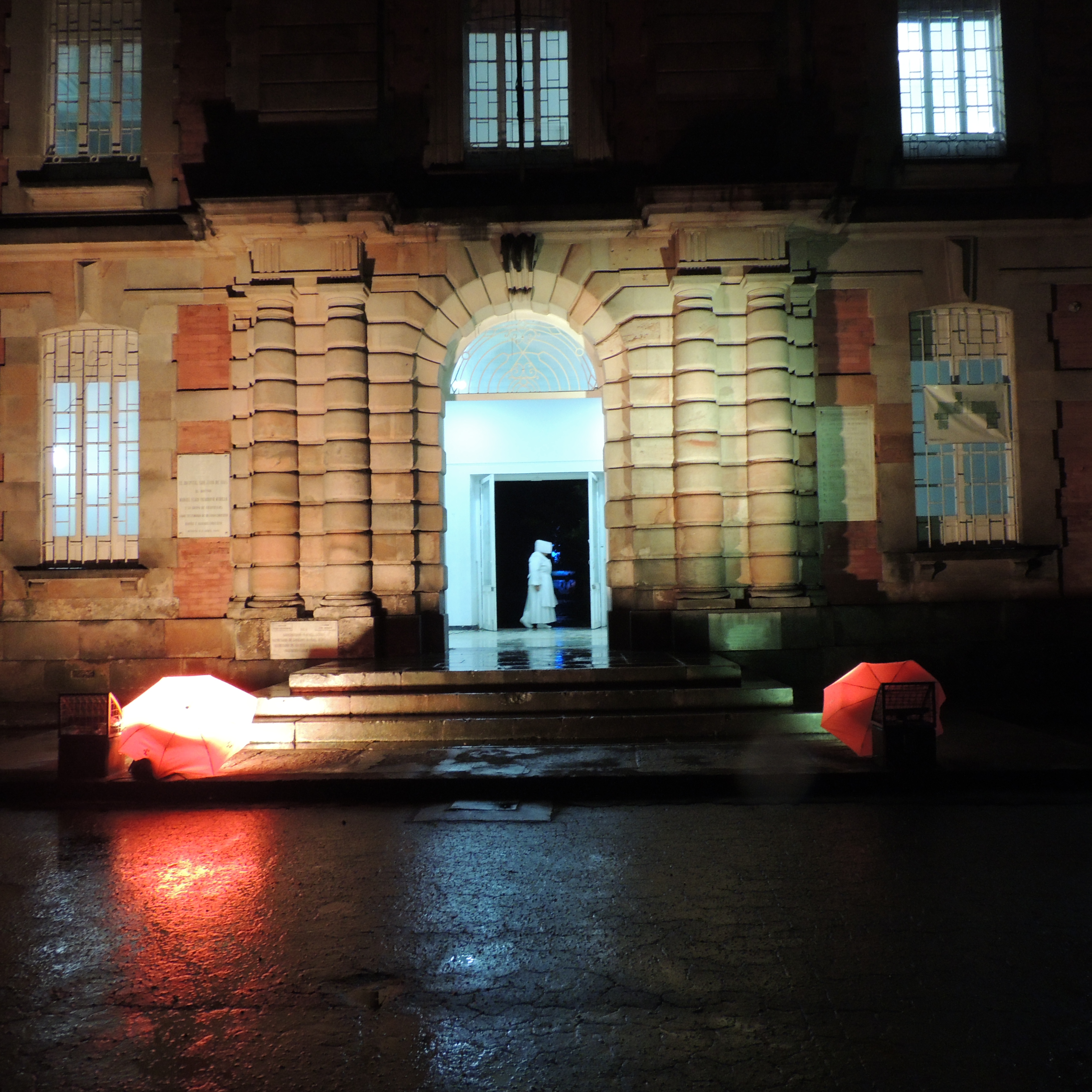
Hospital San Juan De Dios

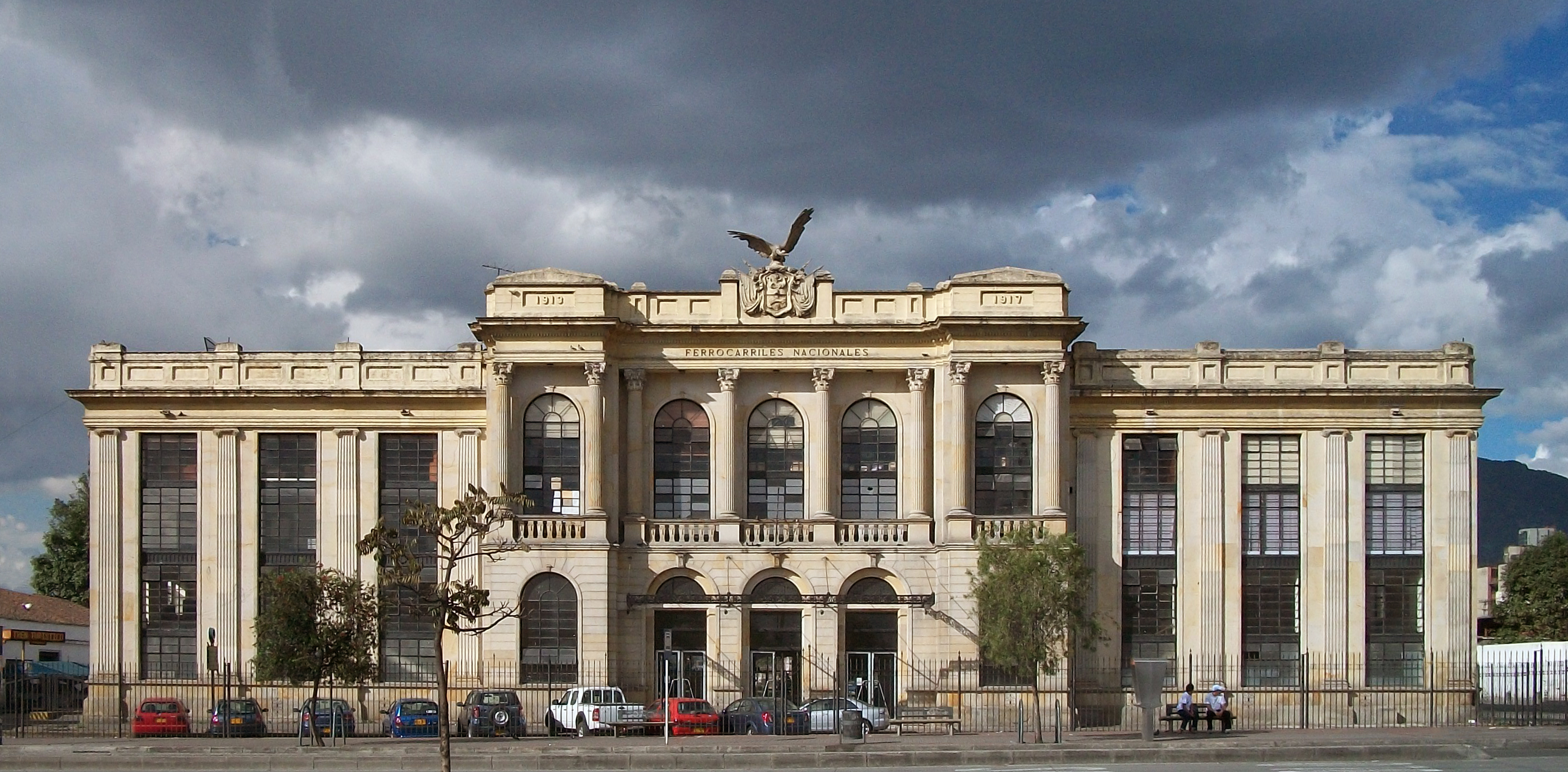
La Sabana Railway Station

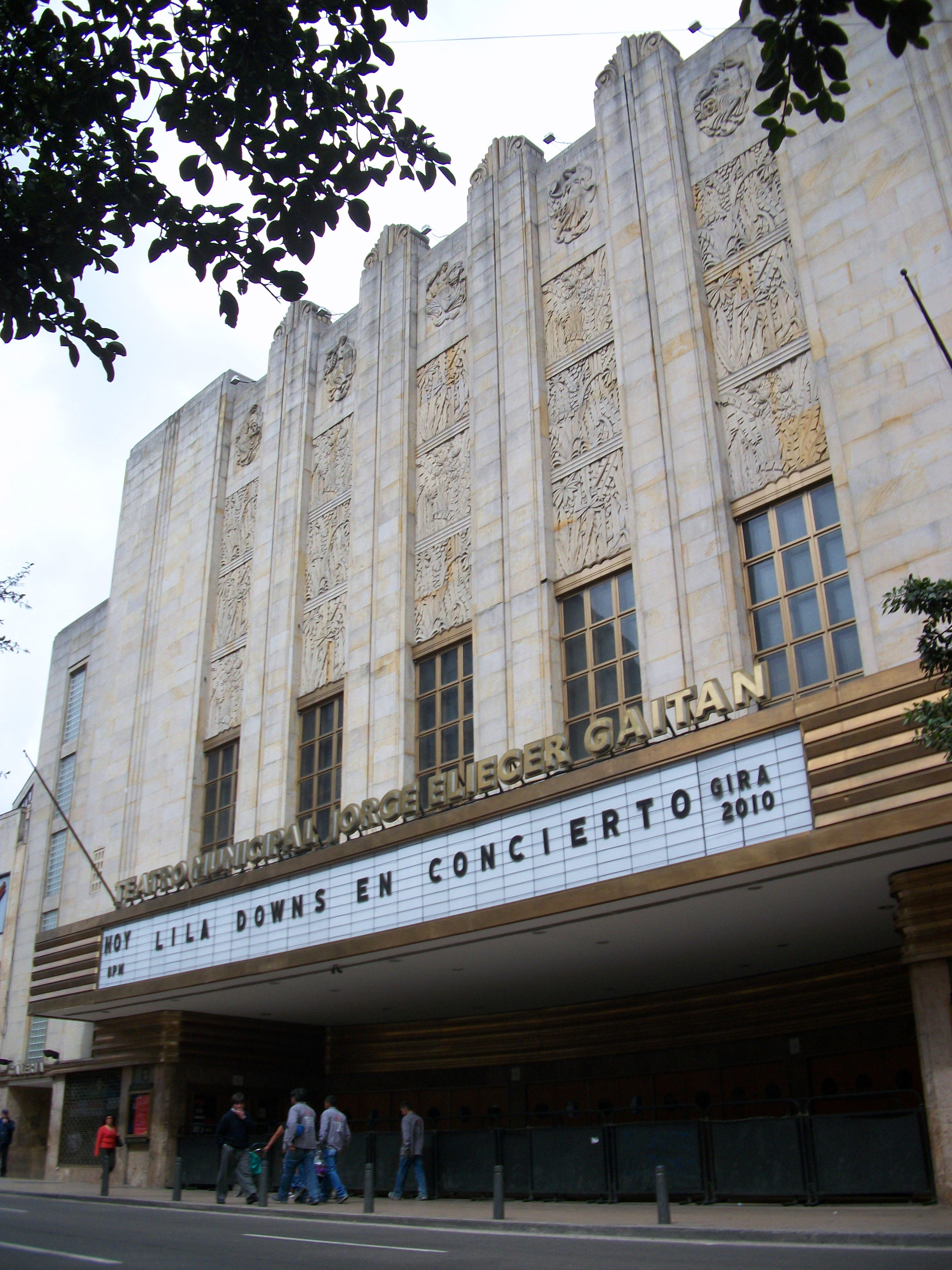
Jorge E. Gaitán Theatre

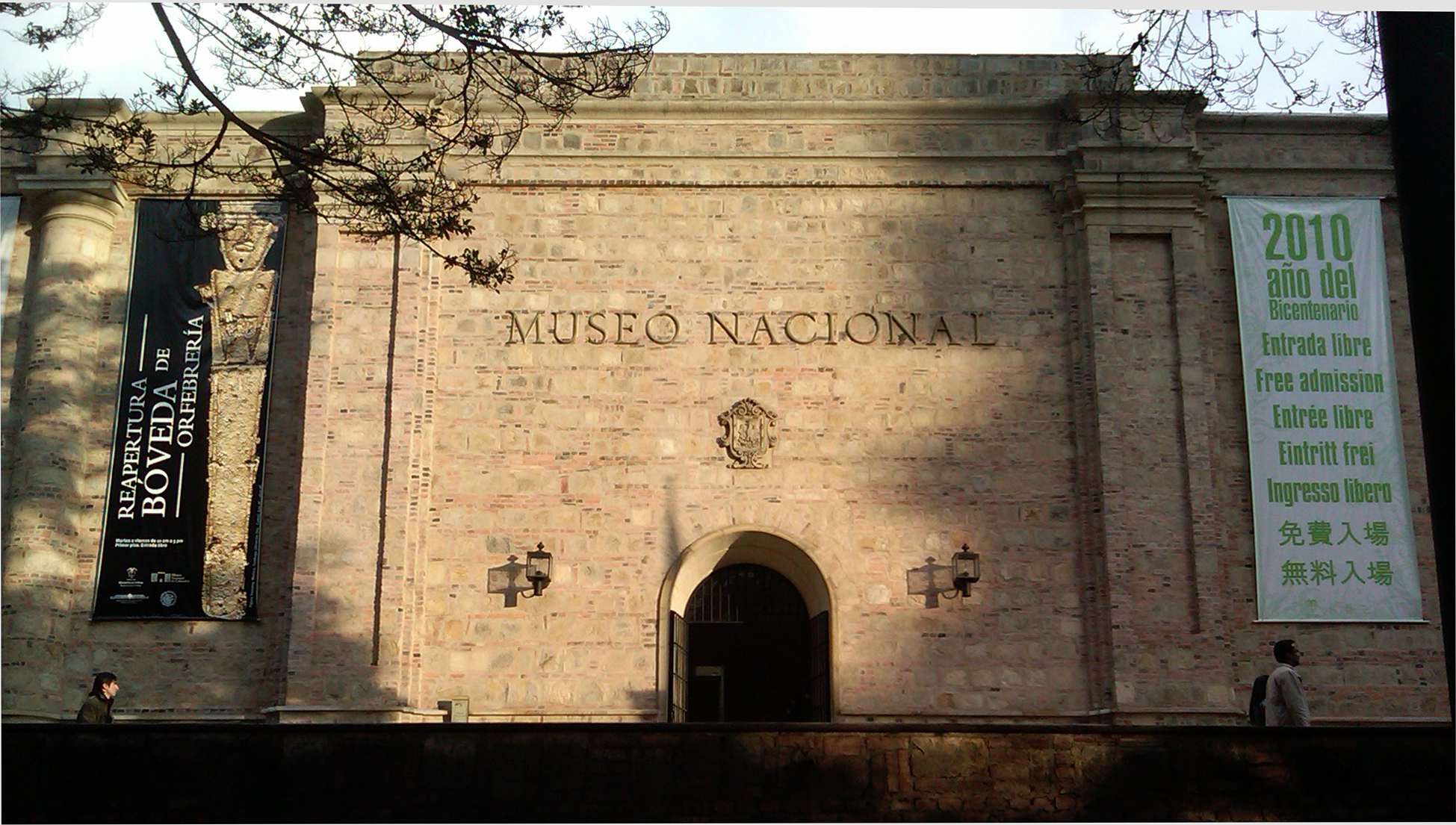
National Museum

== Bolívar ==
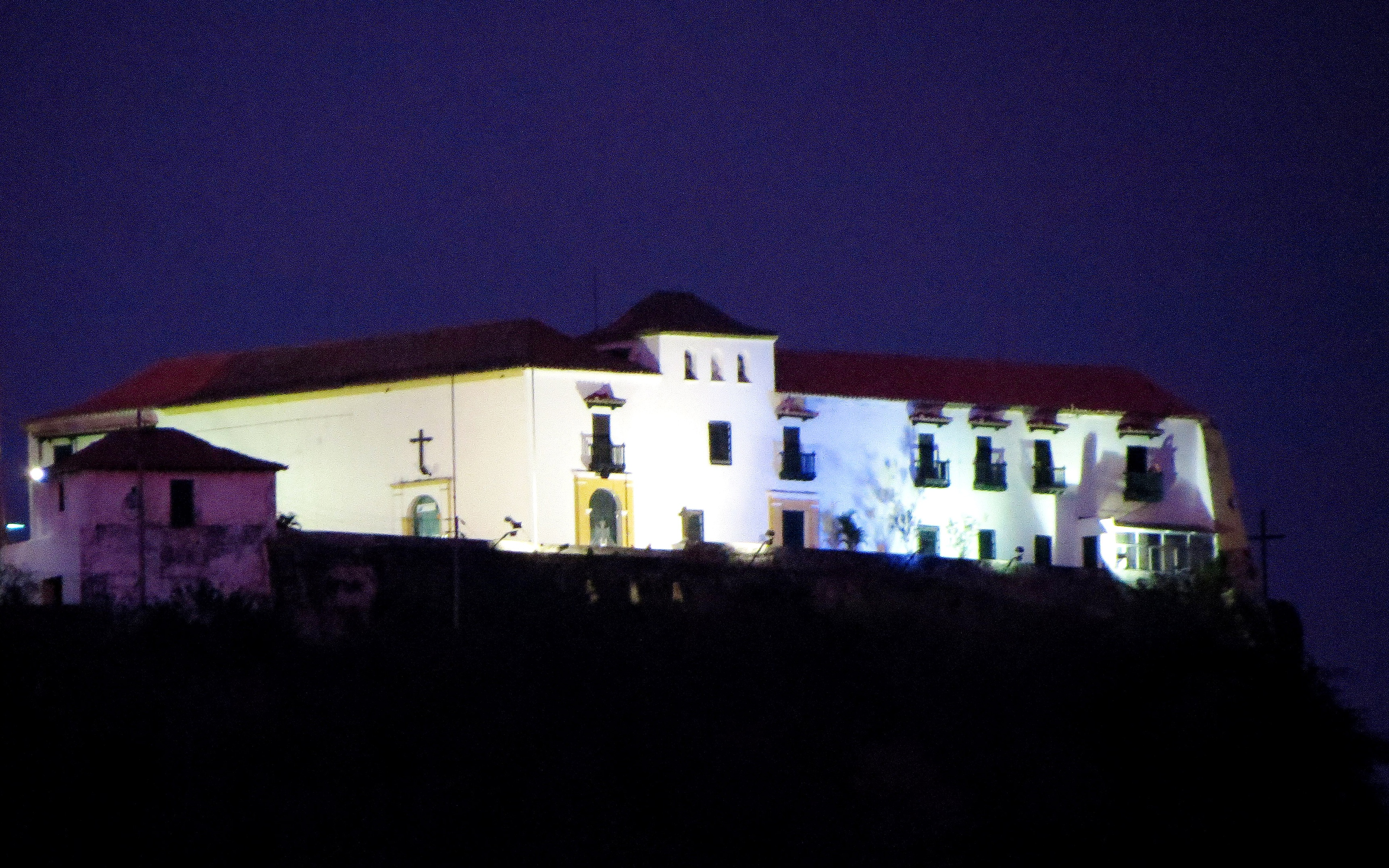
La Popa

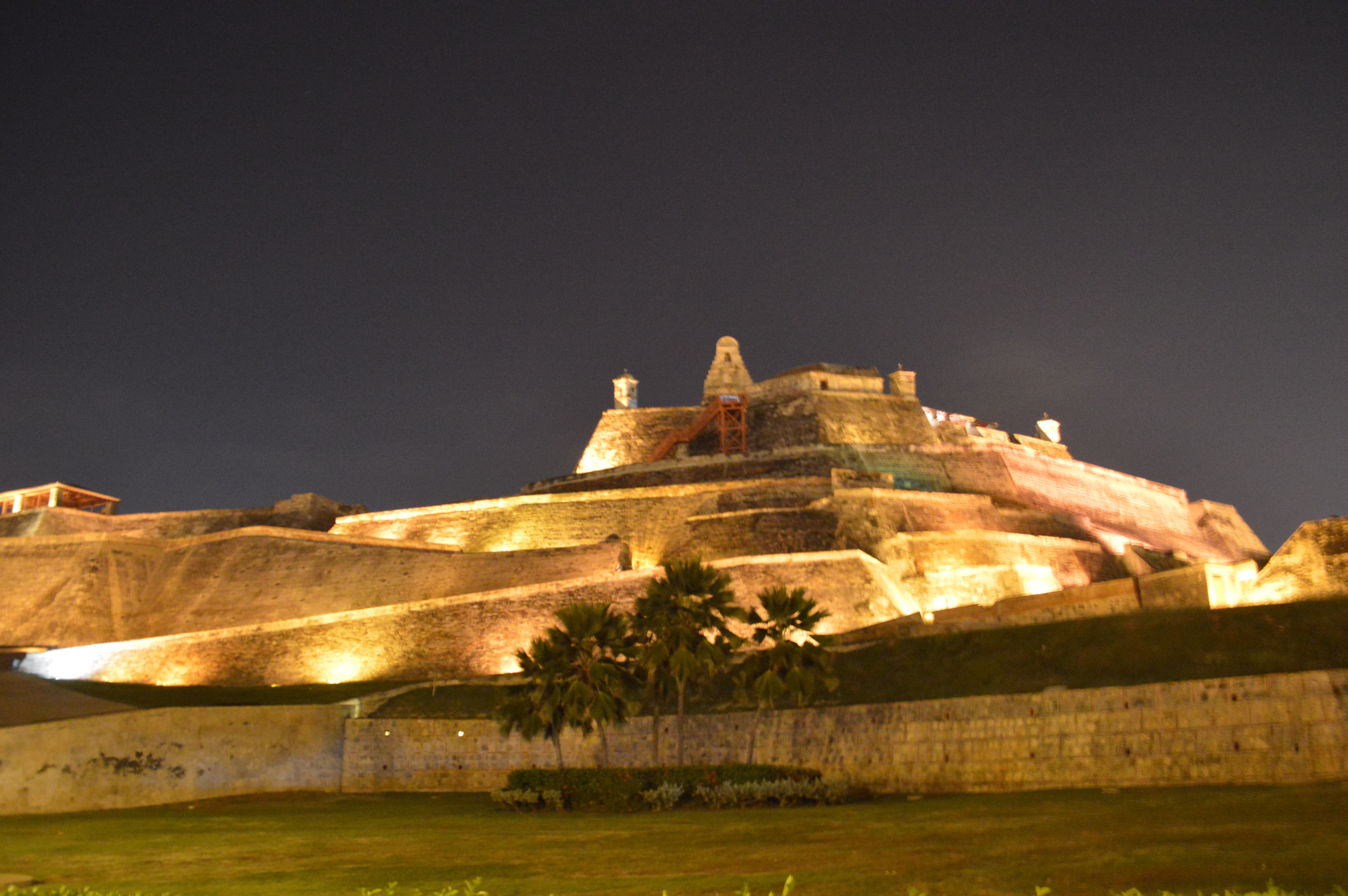
San Felipe Castle

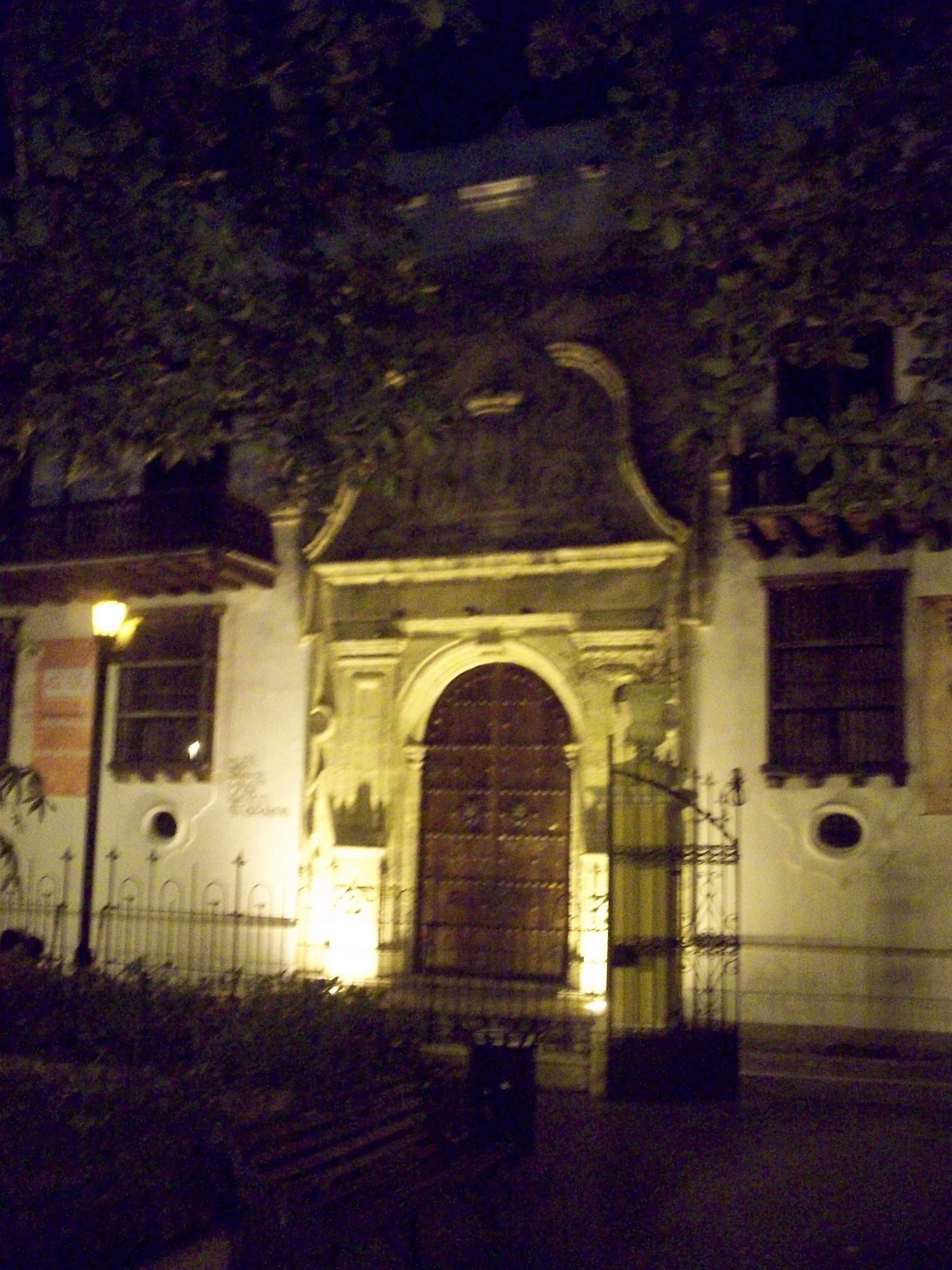
Palacio de La Inquisición

- La Popa, Cartagena: Among many ghosts, the most famous story is the spirit of an evil friar who supposedly sold his soul to the devil. He has been seen roaming around the hill.
- Museo de la Inquisición, Cartagena: Unexplainable sightings and unnerving feelings have been experienced by visitors of the museum.
- Castillo de San Felipe, Cartagena: Haunted by the ghosts of soldiers and prisoners who perished inside.
- Mompox: A duende known as El Cura del río who likes to scare and play pranks on fishermen supposedly haunts on full moon.

== Boyacá ==
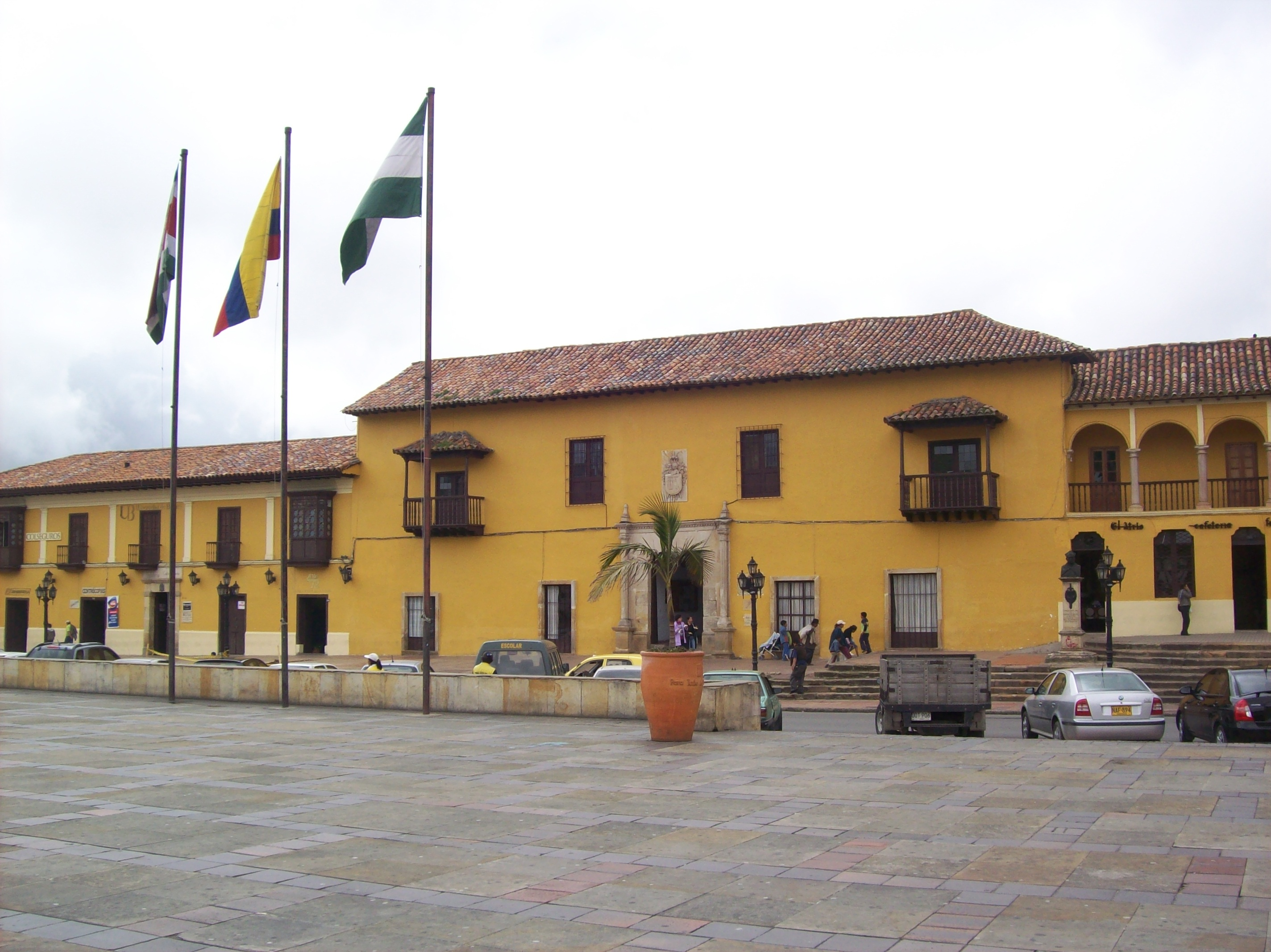
Casa del Fundador

- Casa del Fundador, Tunja: Strange shapes appear on the mirrors, one of them from a dark skinned boy.
- Motavita: This small town is known as a "backyard for witches". Legend says ashes of presumed witches from the whole department ended up scattered around town. Inhabitants believed witches could possess animals to interact with locals.

== Cauca ==
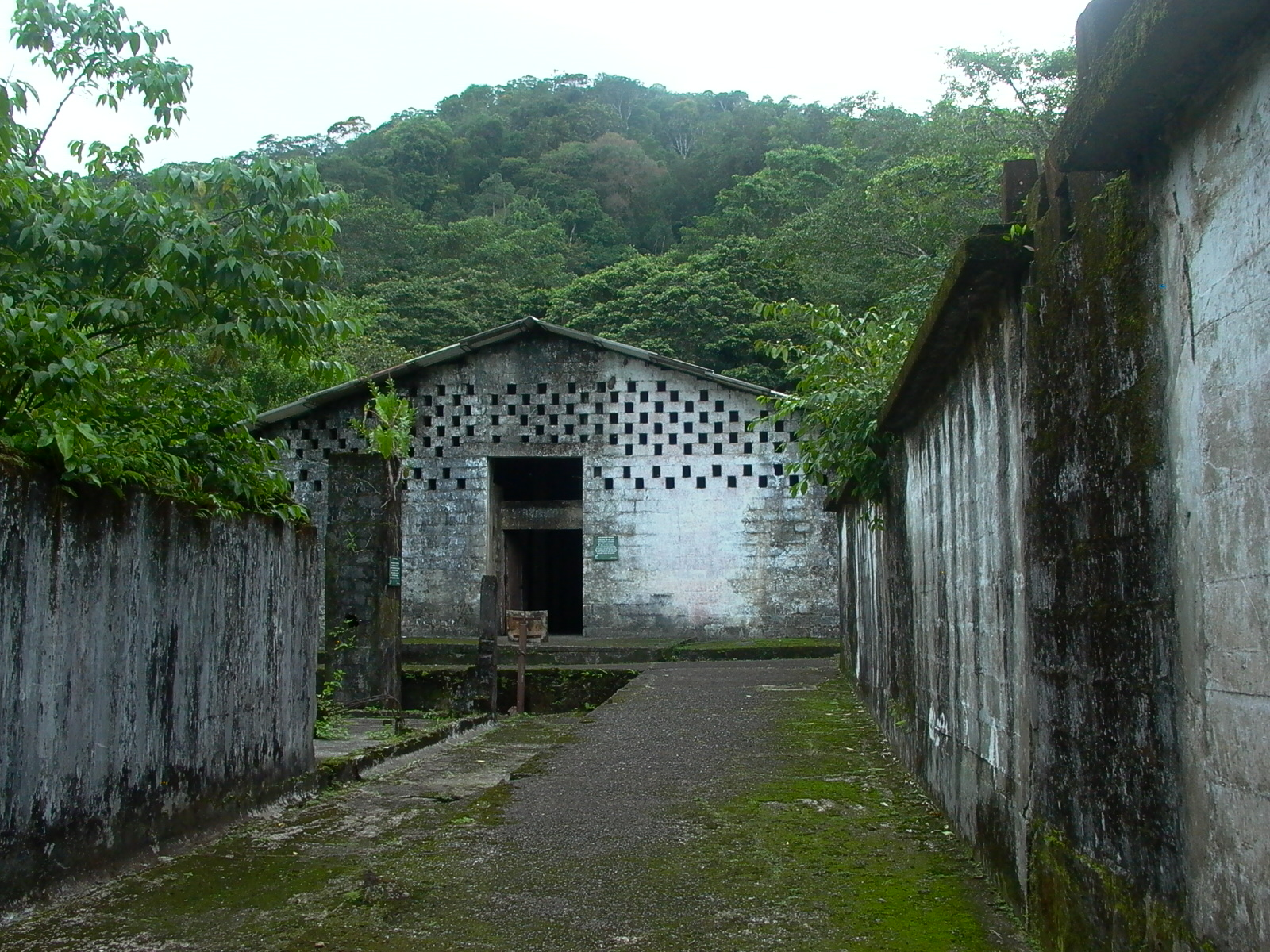
Gorgona Island Prison
- Gorgona Island: People who visit the ruins of the prison that was built in the island report to hear unexplainable sounds, fleeting shadows and the feeling of being retained.

== Cundinamarca ==
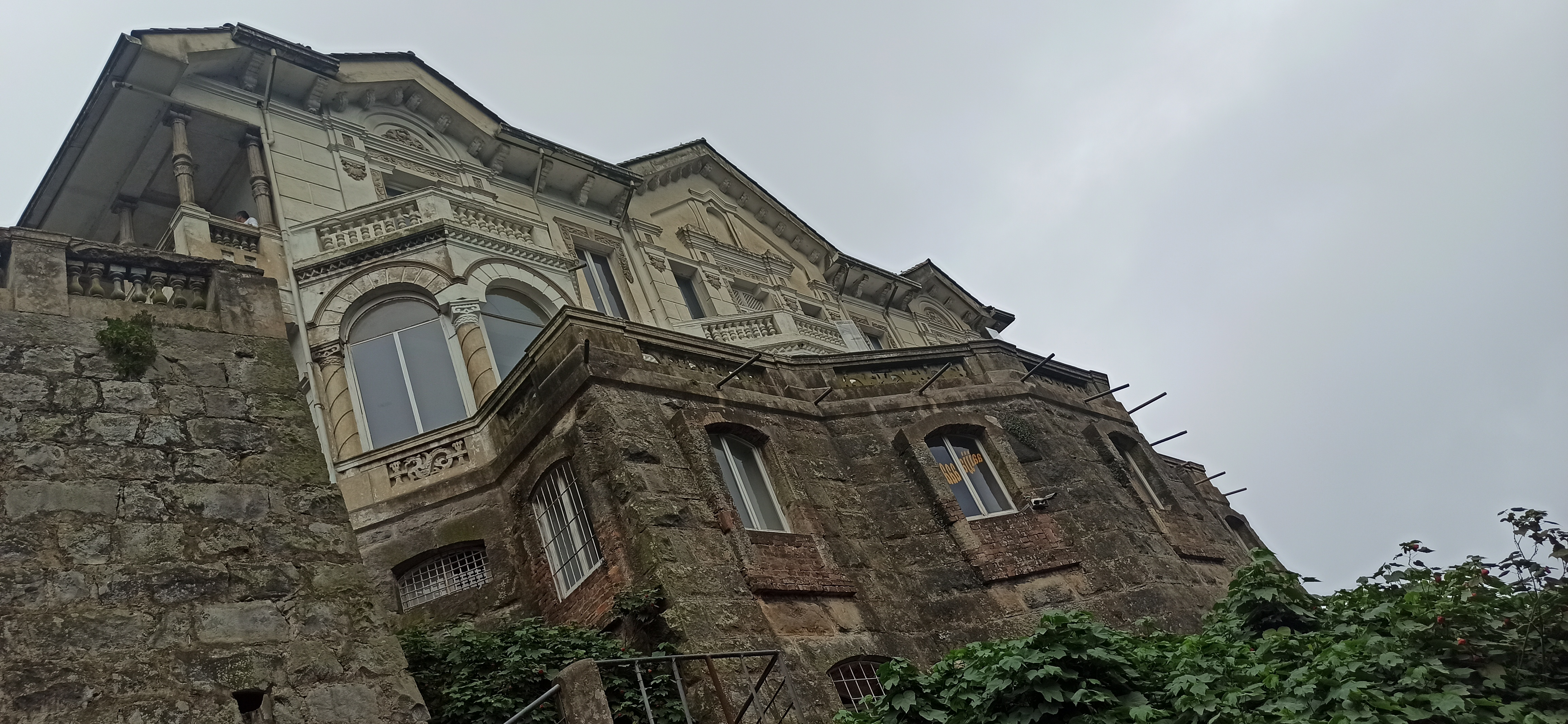
Salto del Tequendama House

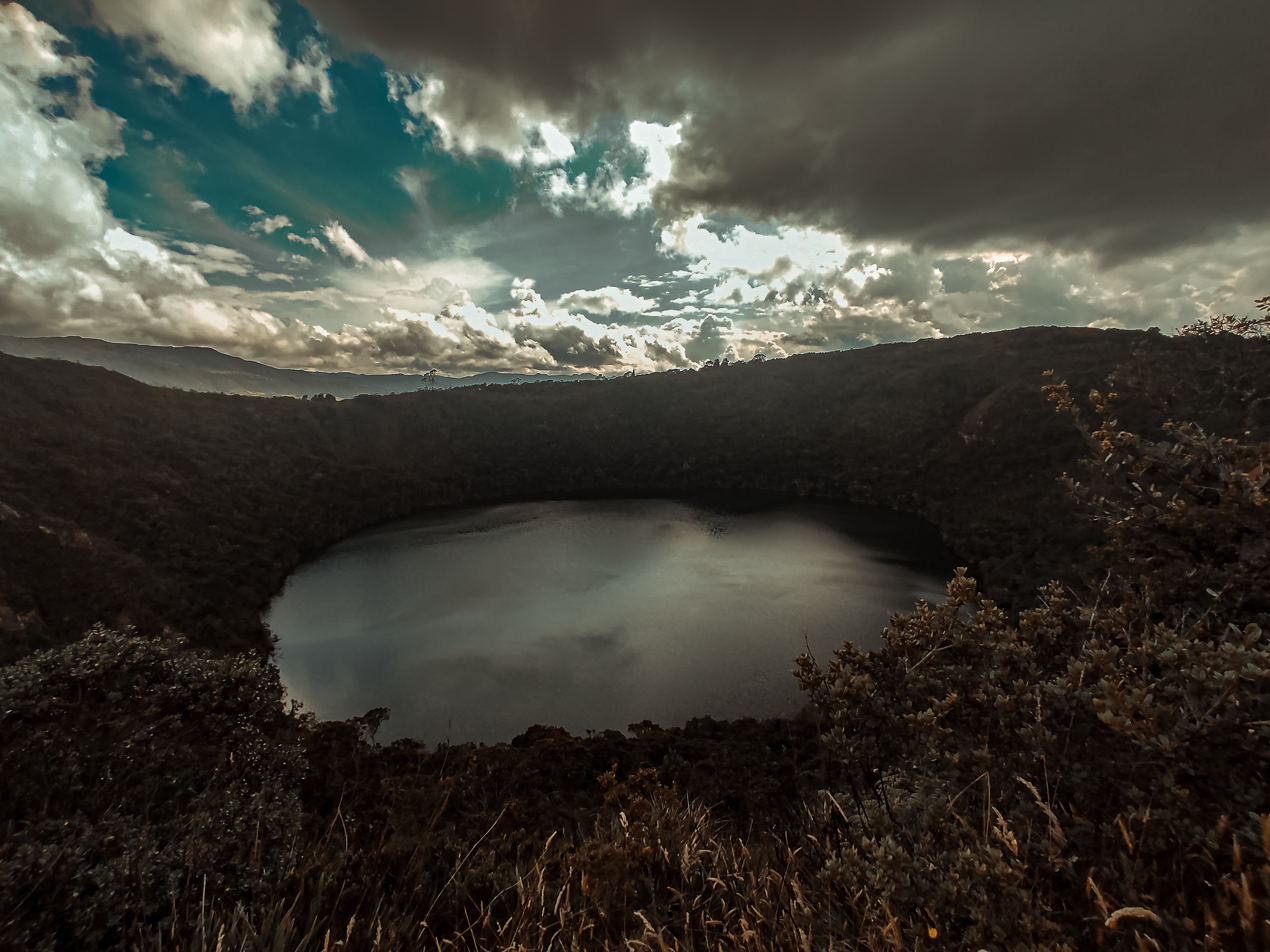
Lake Guatavita
- Salto de Tequendama House, San Antonio del Tequendama: A former hotel near the Tequendama Falls, a place with a high rate of suicides. There has been claims of a headless man seen walking around the terrace or watching from the windows.
- Lake Guatavita, Sesquilé: Being the origin of El Dorado legend, many have felt paranormal presences related to the mystic of this place.

== Valle del Cauca ==
- Telepacífico Studios, Cali: Guards and other employees report eerie presences that roam around the whole building. On a nightshift, a journalist captured what it seems to be an invisible force opening and closing the door where she was working.
- Versalles: A school building that used to be an orphanage and a boarding school have been reported as haunted by some guards.
