= Pedro de Villarreal Ariçeta =

- Born: 1614; Spain
- Died: October 4, 1667 (aged 52–53); Santafé del Nuevo Reino de Granada
- Burial place: Chapel of Our Lady of the Rosary of the former convent of Santo Domingo Santafé
- Occupation: Royal Official Treasurer of the New Kingdom of Granada
- Years active: 1648–1658

Pedro de Villarreal Ariçeta (1614–Santafé Nuevo Reino de Granada, October 4, 1667) was Royal Official Treasurer of the New Kingdom of Granada.

== Biography ==
=== Early years ===
A native of Biscay, he began serving His Majesty Felipe IV as ordinary soldier in the Armada del Mar Océano (fleet of the Atlantic Ocean) on December 6, 1623, with a salary of four escudos per month and still underage to be in that service (his father in 1609 received a salary of a thousand escudos a year as an accountant). In 1633, he began to serve in the Real Armada de la Guardia de la Carrera de las Indias, exercising there the offices of paymaster, silver master and inspector general.

=== Inspector General and Emissary ===
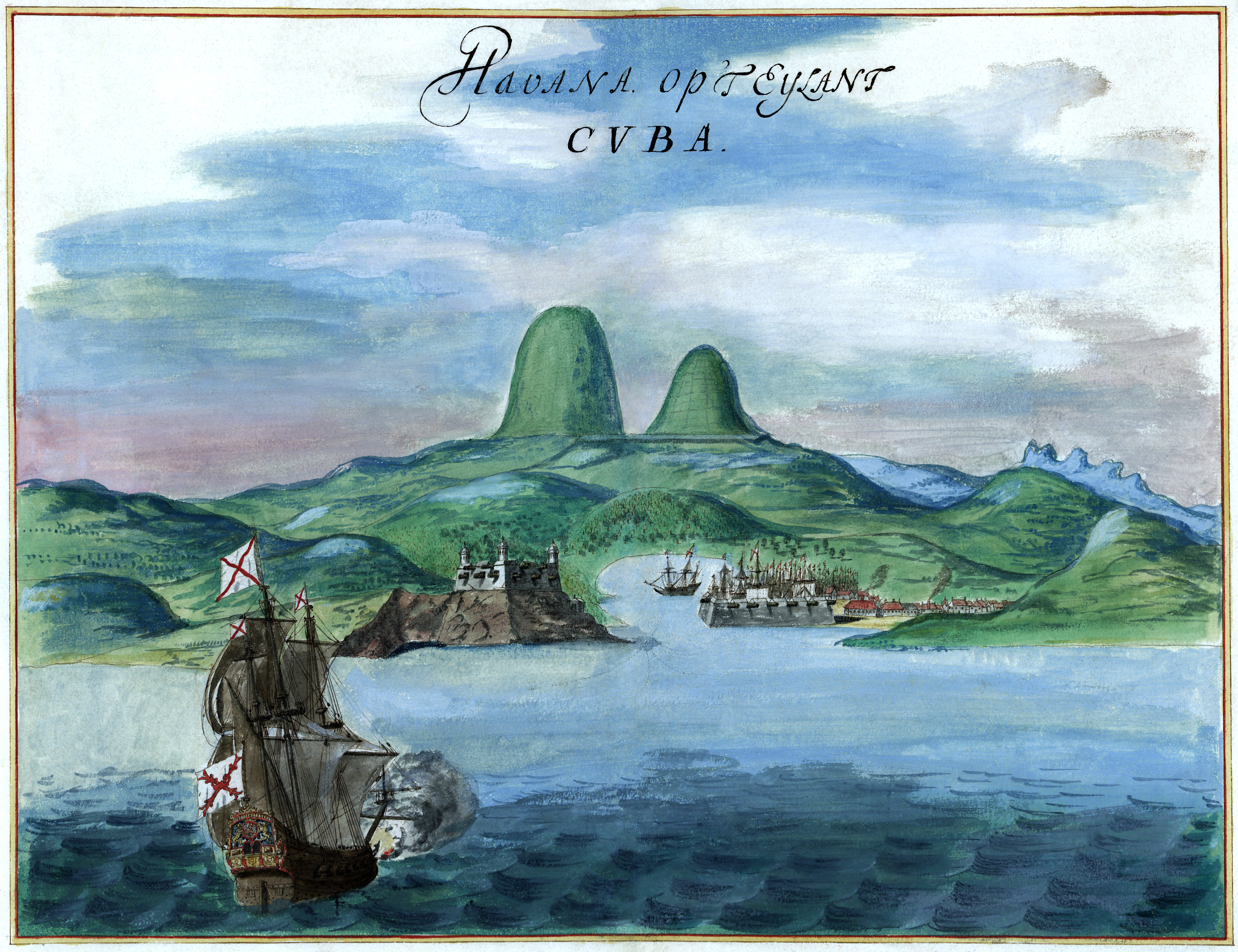
San Cristóbal de La Habana (c. 1639)

On September 20, 1639, the Royal Armada sailed from the port of San Cristóbal de la Habana back to Spain with the royal treasure. As required, General Gerónimo Gómez de Sandoval ordered the inspection of the other ships and on Monday, October 17, Pedro de Villarreal left the flagship accompanied by the accountant, the sergeant major, the chief scribe (Juan de Rivera y Saavedra) and the royal sheriff. That day they visited the admiral's ship and the urca La Vitoria; and on Tuesday the pataches El Galgo and La Margarita, in addition to the galleon San Diego. At nightfall they passed to the urca La Viga. Due to the poor weather, they were forced to remain in the urca until the nightfall of Friday the 21st. As a result of strong winds, at dawn on Saturday, they ran aground on some reefs near the coast of Bermuda. Still dark and in the stormy sea, Pedro de Villarreal had the artillery fired to alert the rest of the Armada of the danger and to change its course. Thus, saving the other ships except for the patache El Galgo. On February 6 of the following year, most of the shipwrecked sailors left Bermuda initially for Havana on a ship named El Salvador for which they paid 7,500 pesos. However, due to the treatment and the costs they incurred on the island, Pedro de Villarreal and other officials who had remained in Bermuda, traveled on February 9 to England to report on the events to the ambassador extraordinary to London, Antonio Sancho Dávila de Toledo y Colonna, the Marquis of Velada. There they left their evidence and papers with Alonso de Cárdenas, the ambassador.

Back in Spain, on July 15, 1640, he returned to his office as inspector general and continued, when needed, providing information to the Council of the Indies about matters convenient to the Crown that happened on his travels. This service of emissary was made official in a letter from the Council dated January 15, 1644. For the trip he made to the Indies under General Pedro de Ursúa y Arismendi; the president of the council, García de Avellaneda y Haro, Count of Castrillo, asked him to help carry out the orders given to the general on matters of importance to the Crown and to increase registrations in a letter dated June 20, 1645. For these services they thanked him in a letter dated February 1, 1646.

=== Royal Official Treasurer of the New Kingdom of Granada ===
After nine journeys, two to New Spain and seven to Tierra Firme, on August 30, 1647, due to the death of the treasurer Lucas de Sagastizabal, he was appointed Official Treasurer of the Royal Treasury of the New Kingdom of Granada and took office on May 13 of the following year.

With the Armada in charge of General Don Martin Carlos de Mencos, in 1649, he sent from Santafé to the Crown 3,531,646 maravedís or the equivalent of 12,983 patacones (peso, half escudo, real de a 8), 7 reales and 32 maravedís. He collected eighty percent by the right of the media anata (tax paid on assuming office) and the rest by the quadrianata, saying that it took a lot of effort amid the rigorous times and the poverty in which the Kingdom found itself. The remittance included taxes on his annual salary of 400,000 maravedís or the equivalent of 1,470 patacones, 4 reales and 24 maravedís.

During his tenure as treasurer, he collected in taxes more than one million six hundred thousand patacones in gold, silver, reales, blankets and other species. He declared that he did so without causing inconvenience or any damage to the republic and without causing any complaints. He served as treasurer until November 4, 1658, and continued as protector of the Indians by appointment on August 19 of the same year.

=== General Protector of the Indians of the New Kingdom of Granada and Chief Accountant of La Visita ===
Because entrustments of Indians were taxable; before being named General Protector of the Indians, he gave testimony, in 1653, for a request from the new Colegio Mayor de Nuestra Señora del Rosario to the president of the Real Audiencia de Santafé that some of the Achaguas Indians be entrusted to the school and taken to their farms in Calandayma. However, in 1655, this request was unequivocally rejected by King Felipe IV himself. This event may have shaped his treatment of the Indians in the performance of the office of protector as he later underscored his service as protector to the Crown and regretted being removed from it by the president of the Audiencia. He considered his replacement, José de Gauna, incompatible with the office for having mistreated the Indians. For this office Pedro de Villarreal earned 800 patacones a year.

Juan Cornejo, prosecutor of the Real Audiencia of Lima, was appointed General Visitor of the Real Audience of Santafé of the New Kingdom of Granada, on June 16, 1657. He appointed Pedro de Villarreal Principal Accountant of La Visita, on December 13, 1658, with a salary of 1,500 maravedís a day. La Visita created tensions and the houses of the accountant, Pedro de Villarreal, and the scribe of La Visita were stoned. Those tensions boiled over on May 22, 1659, when a placard was posted on the door of Juan Cornejo's house that read:

"a simple visitor. look that villareal deceives you. look that he leads you astray and because there is no other who should be visited (and because there is no other who deserves to be hanged). introduces himself to you as if he knows about everyone."
Come here simple one, for what did the king send you. who has as many crimes, as the one you favor.
But then do not complain. when you hear say long live the King and death to the bad government; and this do not judge that barbarian people say it because in time you will see it, when perhaps, you have no remedy even if you want"

This act unleashed a series of events that led to the suspension of La Visita and of the president of the Royal Audience, who at that time was Dionisio Pérez Manrique de Lara. La Visita was banished and moved to La Popa in Cartagena. Pedro de Villarreal's assets in Santafé were seized, and his wife and daughters had to join him in Cartagena after an arduous journey. From there, Pedro de Villarreal reported that when La Visita was suspended, 458,890 patacones had been identified as due because of overdue or hidden accounts, 424 missing cotton blankets (valued at 3 patacones each), seigniorage rights for gold and silver extraction, and inheritance taxes. Adding the accounts that had not been reviewed which included entrustment of Indians, he considered that the amount due surpassed half a million patacones.

=== Final years ===
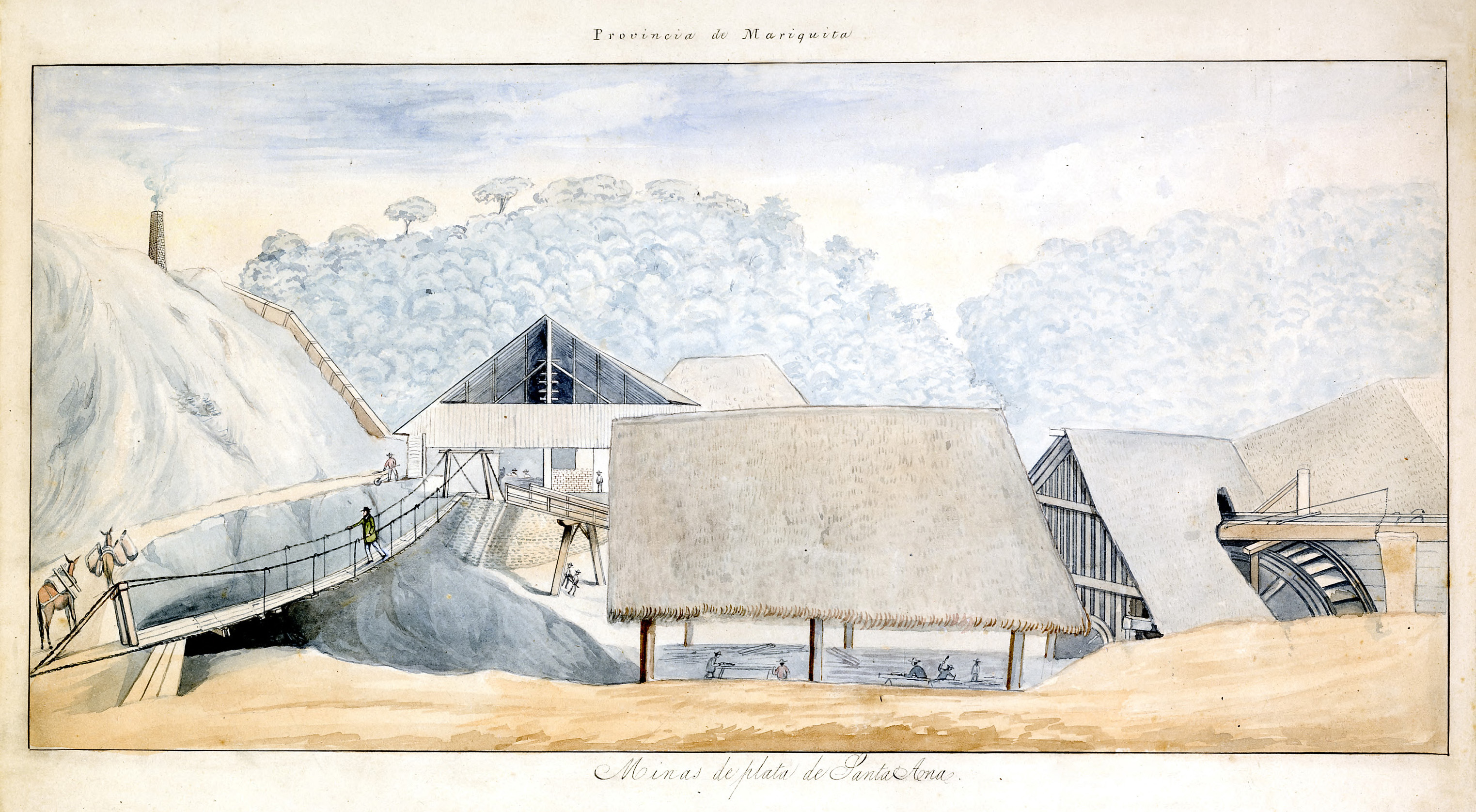
Province of Mariquita. Silver Mines of Santa Ana.

On February 17, 1663; the Cabildo, the Justices and the Regiment of the city of Santafé asked the Crown that Pedro de Villarreal not be reinstated to any official position in this city due to the inconveniences that he had caused as accountant of La Visita. The Santafereños accused him of having shortages in the accounts from the time he was inspector general in the amount of 22,000 pesos even though he was cleared of debts before taking office as treasurer and having been accredited by Juan Flórez de Ocariz.

Ocariz reported that Pedro de Villarreal served as mayor of the Santa Ana, Las Lajas, and San José de Frías silver mines from 1665 until his death. He was buried in the vaults of the chapel of Our Lady of the Rosary of the former convent of Santo Domingo of the Dominican fathers for having been a member of its confraternity. In a last grievance against Pedro de Villarreal, the convent was demolished by the Colombians in 1939.
