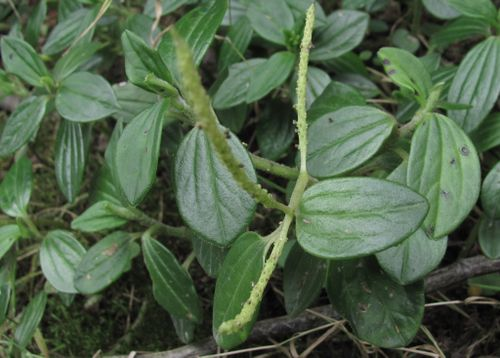

Scientific classification
- Kingdom: Plantae
- Clade: Tracheophytes
- Clade: Angiosperms
- Clade: Magnoliids
- Order: Piperales
- Family: Piperaceae
- Genus: Peperomia
- Species: P. tequendamana

Binomial name
- Peperomia tequendamana Trel.

Synonyms
- Peperomia rotundata var. tequendamana (Trel.) Steyerm.

= Peperomia tequendamana =

Species of hemiepiphytic subshrub

Peperomia tequendamana is a species of hemiepiphytic subshrub in the genus Peperomia. It was first described by William Trelease and published in the book "Journal of the Washington Academy of Sciences 16(1): 207. 1926". It primarily grows on montane tropical areas. The species name came from Tequendama Falls, where specimens of this species were first collected.

== Description ==
It is a moderately small, ascending herb with more or less branches; stem moderate (2–3 mm) with short internodes, rusty crisp-villous; leaves alternate (exceptionally opposite), broadly elliptic or ovate-elliptic, obtuse at both ends or abruptly blunt-acuminate, moderate (1.5 x 2.2 x 4 cm), 5-nerved, appreassed–hairy on both faces, grandular beneath; petiole very short (2 mm.), hairy; spkies terminal and axillary, 2 x 60 mm. somewhat loosely subverticiliately flowered; peduncle approximately 10 mm. long, from sparsely crisp–pubescent glabrescent; bracts round-peltate; ovary impressed, ovoid, obtuse; stigma subspical.

== Distribution ==
It is endemic to Central America and South America.
