= Herazo =

Herazo is a surname. Notable people with the surname include:

- Cristina Herazo (born 1952), American nurse and former actress
- Héctor Rojas Herazo (1920–2002), Colombian novelist, poet, journalist and painter
- María Fernanda Herazo (born 1997), Colombian tennis player
- Victoria Herazo (born 1959), American racewalker
