= Tequendamita Falls =

Waterfall in Colombia

Coordinates: 6°04′56″N 75°28′33″W

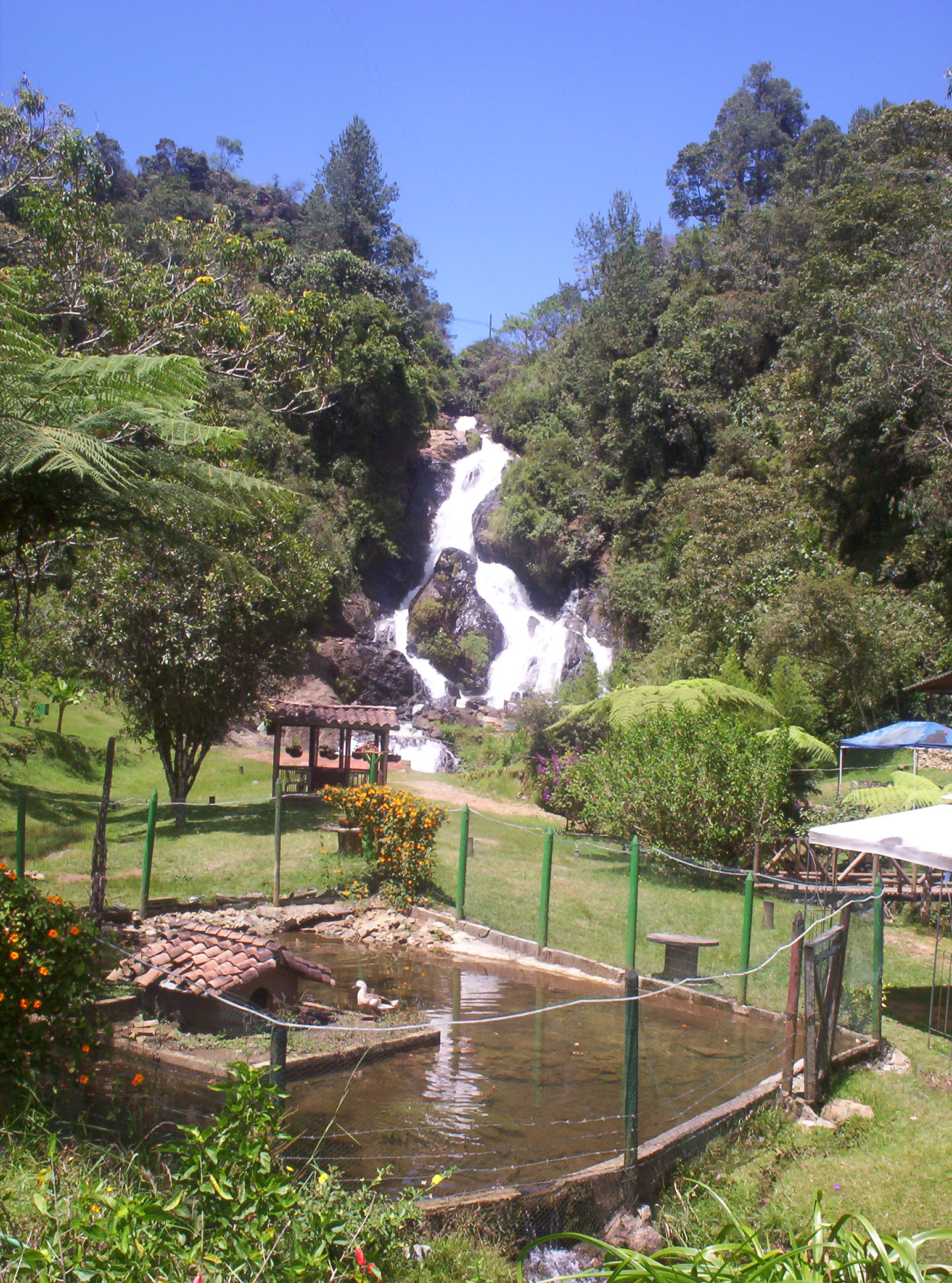
Tequendamita Falls

Tequendamita Falls is a small natural waterfall in Colombia located in the municipality of El Retiro, in the eastern department of Antioquia. The waterfall can be found along the road between Medellín and La Ceja. It is considered a cultural tourist site in Antioquia and is named after Tequendama Falls, another Colombian waterfall located in the department of Cundinamarca.

Tequendamita has a jump of 20 meters in height and its source is a stream in the village Chuscala Don Diego. The waterfall is surrounded by many attractions, restaurants, and grocery stores, making it popular with visitors to the region. There is a restaurant at the foot of the falls called Parador Tequendamita.

== See also ==
- List of waterfalls
