= Silva Poetry House =

National monument of Colombia

Coordinates: 4.5988°N 74.0707°W

- Casa de Poesía Silva
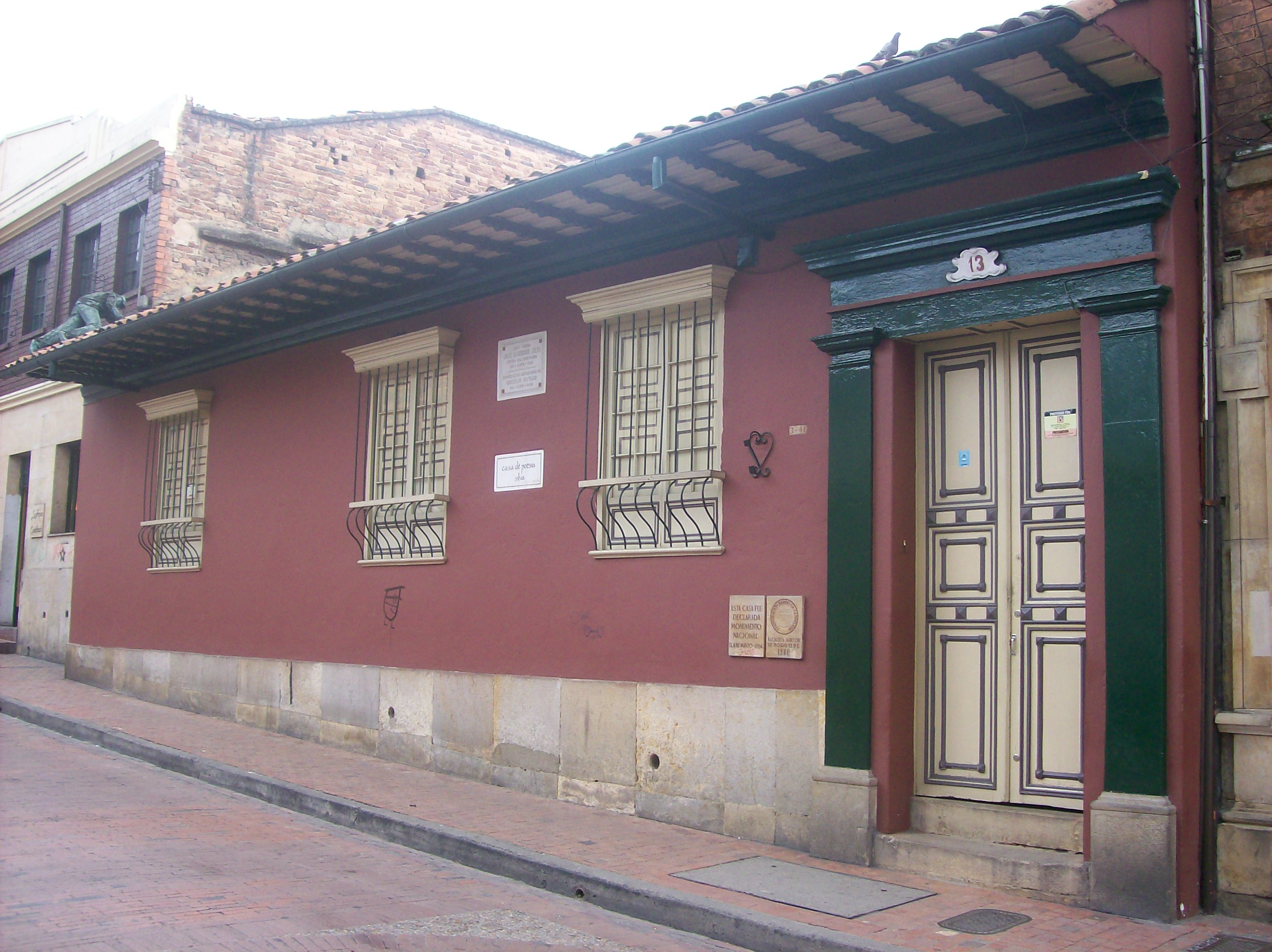
- Established: 24 May 1986
- Location: Calle 12C N° 3-41, Bogotá, Colombia
- Director: Pedro Alejo Gómez

The ‘’‘Silva Poetry House’’’ is a Colombian historical cultural organization located in the Candelaria neighborhood of Bogotá. It was founded on May 24, 1986 by Belisario Betancur, in the house where the Colombian poet José Asunción Silva used to live. It has a library and a bookshop specializing in poetry, a music library, and an auditorium. The house was declared a national monument of Colombia in 1995.

== Characteristics ==
The house is a private non-profit foundation whose goal is to facilitate and encourage the study, understanding and enjoyment of poetry of all times and countries. This has permanent services, several of which are provided free of charge. In their brokers are photographs of the poet and some items that belonged to him, donated by his family. It offers services such as guided tours for schools, the elderly, and the blind, and poetry workshops.

It has created events like "Poetry has the word", "The insurgent souls", and "Rest in peace war", where stakeholders meet for a poetry reading and listening to poetry.

The Poetry House operates Colombia's only bookstore dedicated to the subject of worldwide poetry. Its editorial has published History of Colombian Poetry, Flower penalty by Mario Rivero, and the complete works of Eduardo Cote Lamus, among others. The magazine Casa Silva is annual.

It delivers the poetry prize José Asunción Silva, the recognition of a lifetime of poetic work. Among the honorees are Mario Rivero, Fernando Charry Lara, Hernando Valencia Goelkel, Héctor Rojas Herazo, and Rogelio Echavarría.

Maria Mercedes Carranza was the director from 1986 to 2003, the year of her death. The current director is the lawyer and writer Pedro Alejo Gomez.
