= Tolú =

Town in Sucre, Colombia

Coordinates: 9°32′N 75°35′W

- Municipality and town
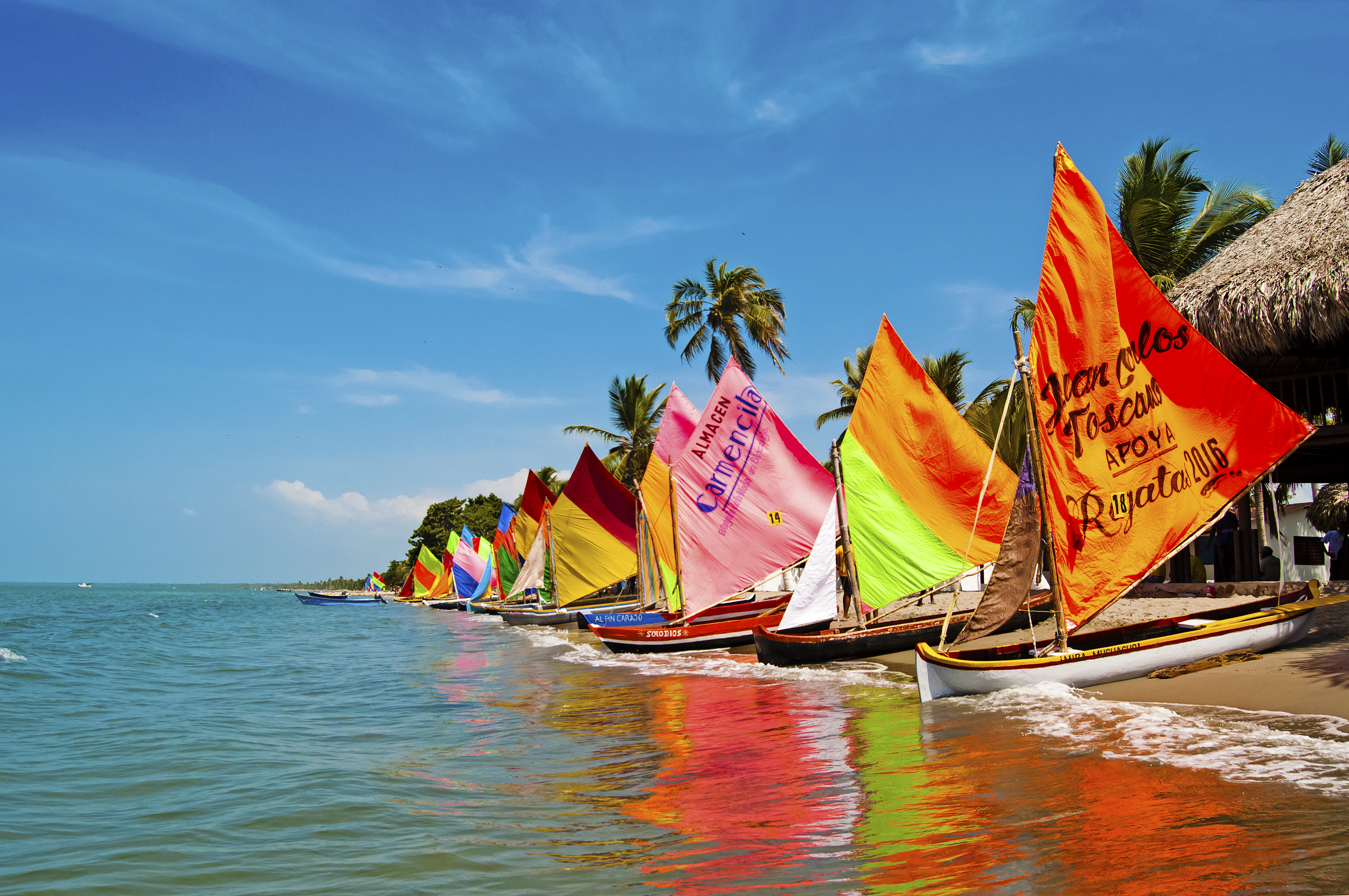

- Flag Coat of arms

- Location of the municipality and town of Tolú in the Sucre Department of Colombia.
- Country: Colombia
- Department: Sucre Department

Area
  - Municipality and town: 301.22 km^{2} (116.30 sq mi)
  - Urban: 8.75 km^{2} (3.38 sq mi)
- Elevation: 2 m (6.6 ft)

Population (2018 census)
  - Municipality and town: 32,922
  - Density: 109.30/km^{2} (283.07/sq mi)
  - Urban: 26,401
  - Urban density: 3,020/km^{2} (7,810/sq mi)
- Time zone: UTC-5 (Colombia Standard Time)

Tolú, also known as Santiago de Tolú, is a small town in Sucre Department, northern Colombia on the Caribbean coast. The municipality has an area of 500 km^{2}. It is named after the Tolú, one of the pre-Columbian indigenous people of the North Colombia lowlands.

The municipality of Tolú borders to the North with San Onofre, to the East with Toluviejo, to the South with Coveñas, Palmito and Sincelejo.

== Notable people ==
- Didier Fuentes (b. 2005), MLB pitcher, Atlanta Braves
- Héctor Rojas Herazo (1920–2002), novelist, poet and painter

== See also ==
- Toluene
