= Héctor Rojas Herazo =

Colombian writer and artist (1920–2002)

- Born: August 12, 1921; Tolú
- Died: April 11, 2002 (aged 81); Bogotá
- Writing career
- Genres: novels, poetry

Héctor Rojas Herazo (August 12, 1920 – April 11, 2002) was a Colombian novelist, poet, journalist and painter.

Rojas was born in Tolú as son of Juan Emiro Rojas and Blance Berta Herazo. He was baptized on October 6, 1921. He started artistic works in his childhood and was taught in plastic arts by his cousin José Manuel González. Later he wrote as journalist for several papers. As painter he realized more than sixty exhibitions on the American and the European continent. He died in Bogotá.

== Publications ==
- Rostro en la soledad, poetry, 1952
- Desde la luz preguntan por nosotros, 1952
- Tránsito de Caín, poetry, 1953
- Desde la luz preguntan por nosotros, poetry, 1956
- Agresión de las formas contra el ángel, poetry, 1961
- Respirando el verano, novel, 1962
- En noviembre llega el arzobispo, novel, 1966
- Márquez’s One Hundred Years of Solitude
- Señales y garabatos del habitante, novel, 1976
- Celia se pudre, novel, 1985
- Las úlceras de Adán, novel, 1995

== Honors ==
- Honorary doctor of the Universidad de Cartagena, 1997
- Commander of the Medal of the Congress of the Republic of Colombia, 1991
- ProArtes literary merit medal, 1995 and 1998 (Cruz de Boyacá)
- Golden Francisco Antonio Zea order of merit, Universidad de Antioquia, 1998
- National José Asunción Silva poetry award, Bogotá, 1999
- Medal of merits of the Universidad Santo Tomás de Aquino
