= Tequendama Falls Museum =

Museum in Colombia

Coordinates: 4.5861°N 74.3000°W

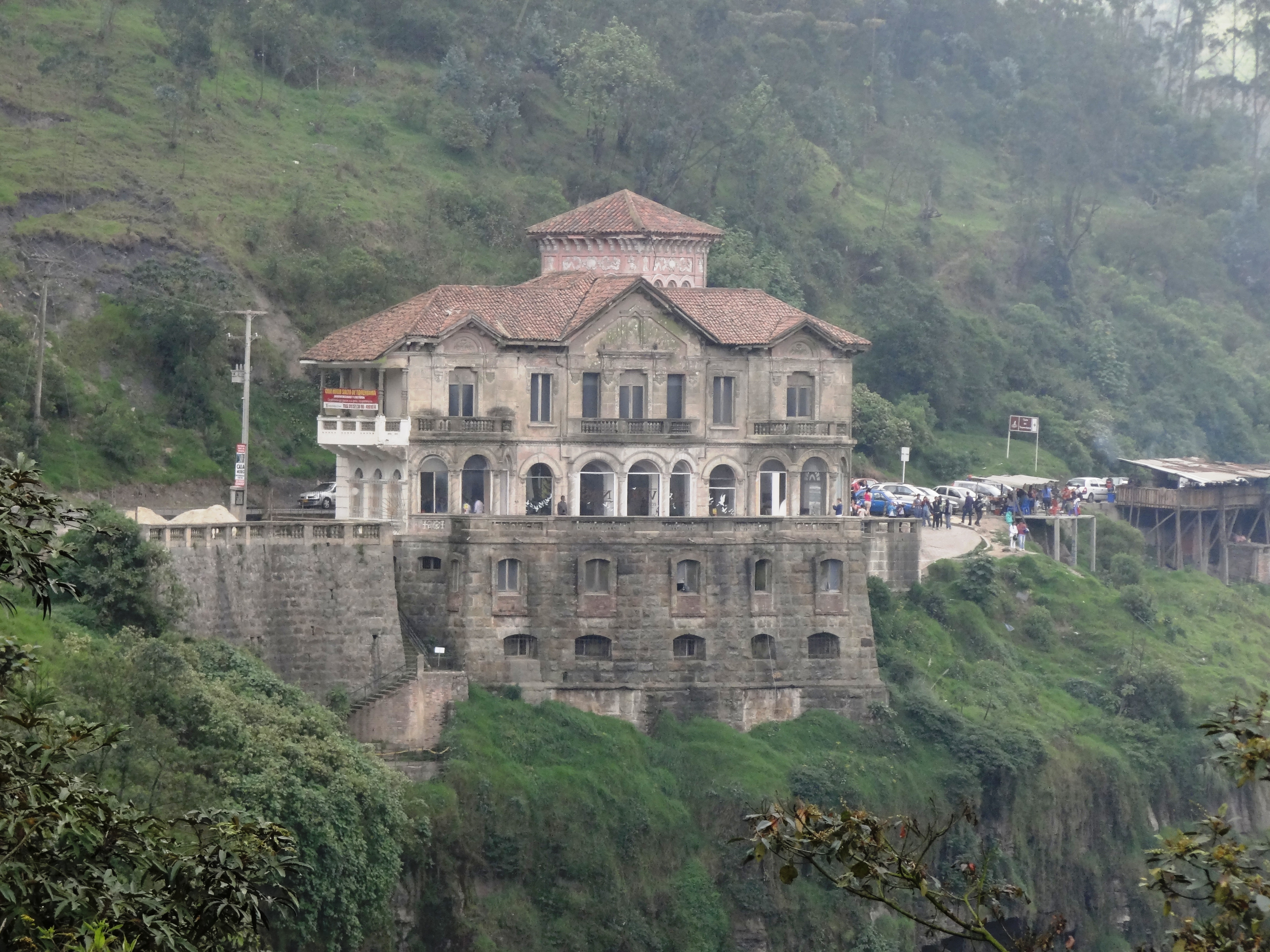
Tequendama Falls Hotel before renovations

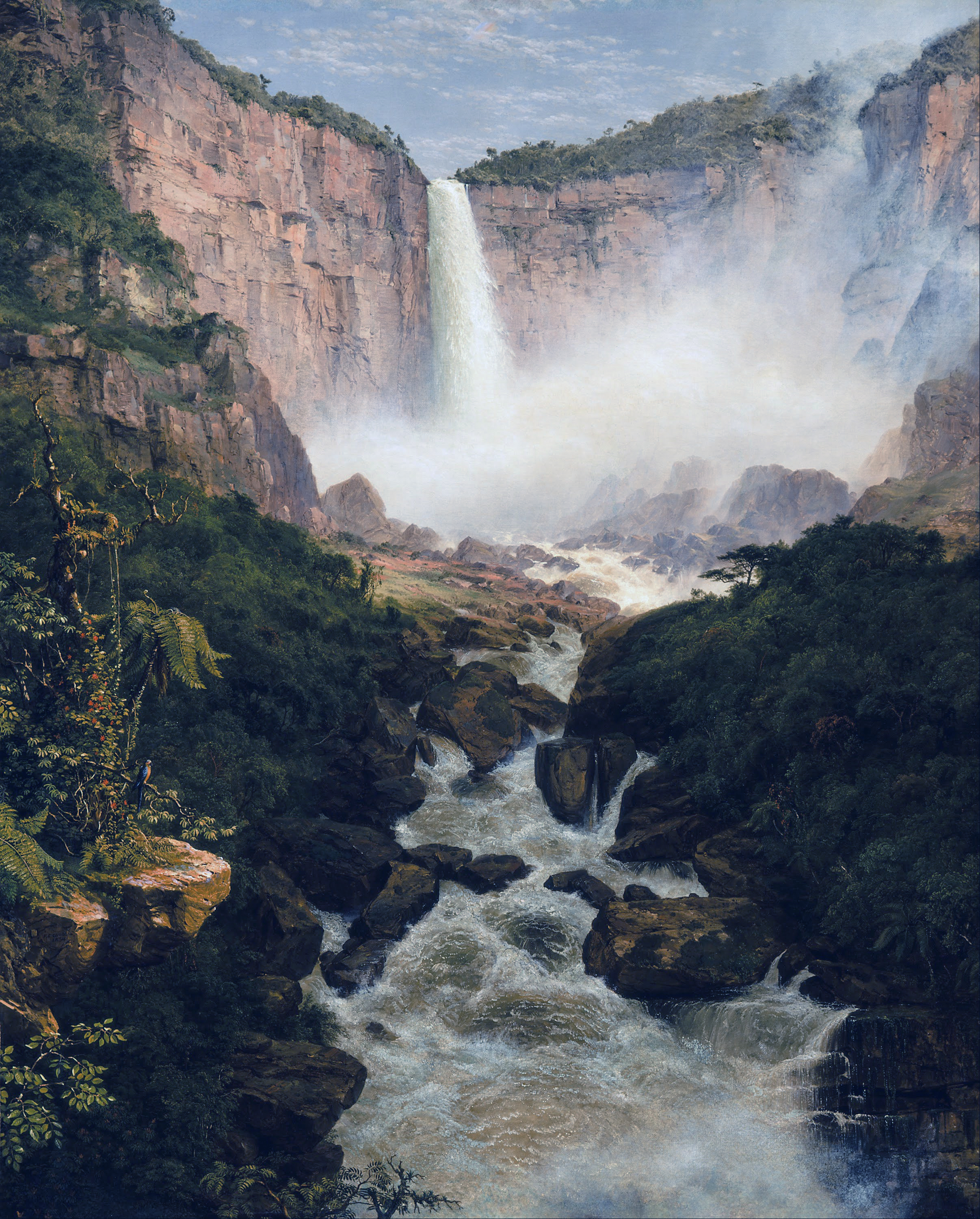
Tequendama Falls depicted in an 1854 painting

The Tequendama Falls Museum of Biodiversity and Culture (Spanish: Casa Museo Salto de Tequendama Biodiversidad y Cultura) is a museum and mansion in San Antonio del Tequendama, Colombia. The museum overlooks Tequendama Falls on the Bogotá River. Before renovation, the building was an abandoned hotel, known as the Tequendama Falls Hotel (La Casa del Salto del Tequendama).

== Etymology ==
The name Tequendama means in the Chibcha language of the Muisca people "he who precipitated downward".

== History ==
=== Mansion ===
In 1923, the building was constructed as a mansion by the architect Carlos Arturo Tapias, as a symbol of the joy and elegance of the elite citizens of the 20s. "The Mansion of Tequendama Falls", as the house was called, was built during the presidency of Pedro Nel Ospina (1922-1926). The Tequendama Falls Hotel was reached by train from Bogotá.

=== Hotel ===
The building functioned as a hotel from 1928 until its abandonment in the early 90s for more than two decades due to Bogotá River contamination.

=== Museum ===
The Institute of Natural Sciences of the National University of Colombia and the Ecological Farm Foundation of Porvenir were jointly in charge of the renovations to convert the hotel into a museum. The mansion reopened as a museum in 2013 with its first exhibit: "Caverns, ecosystems of the subterranean world".

In the late 2000s, the hotel received the status of an object of cultural heritage, which made it possible to allocate funds for its reconstruction. Institute of Natural Sciences, National University of Colombia and the Ecological Farm Foundation of Porvenir Foundation, which bought a building in 2011, took the restructuring of the building to transform into its museum. On the reconstruction and refining of the adjacent territory from the European Union, the Fund was allocated €300,000 (US$410,000). In parallel, the Institute of Natural Sciences National University of Colombia held work on cleaning the River Bogota and her tributaries.

In June 2013, the Museum opened an exhibition "La Anatomía del Cuerpo Humano De Francesco Antommarki", on which the anatomical drawings of the French doctor of the Francisco Antommarchi were presented, and in September - "Un Día En El Desierto De La Tatacoa" telling about the biological diversity of the desert of Tatakoa.

== Gallery ==
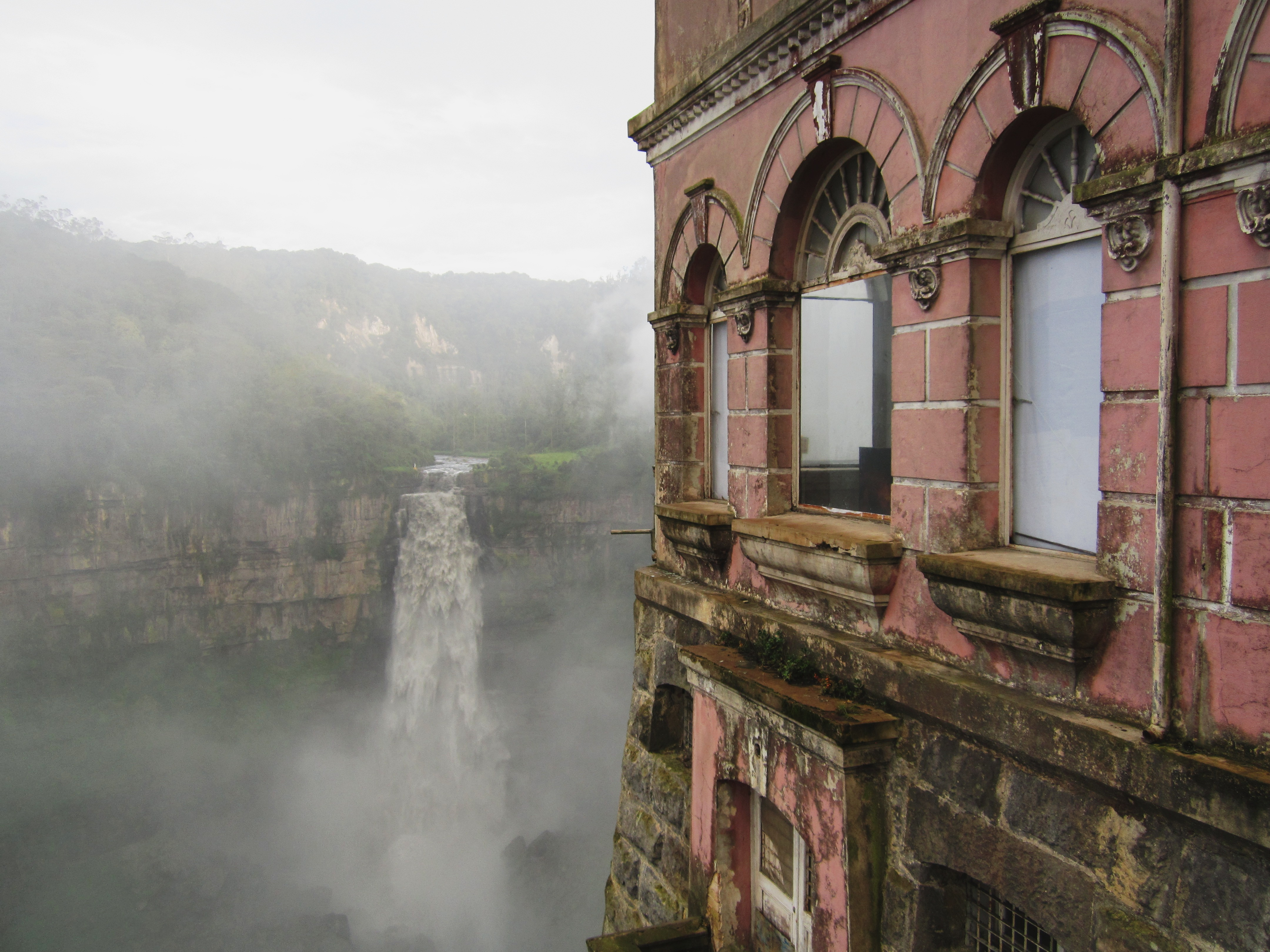
Tequendama Falls Hotel overlooking Tequendama Falls

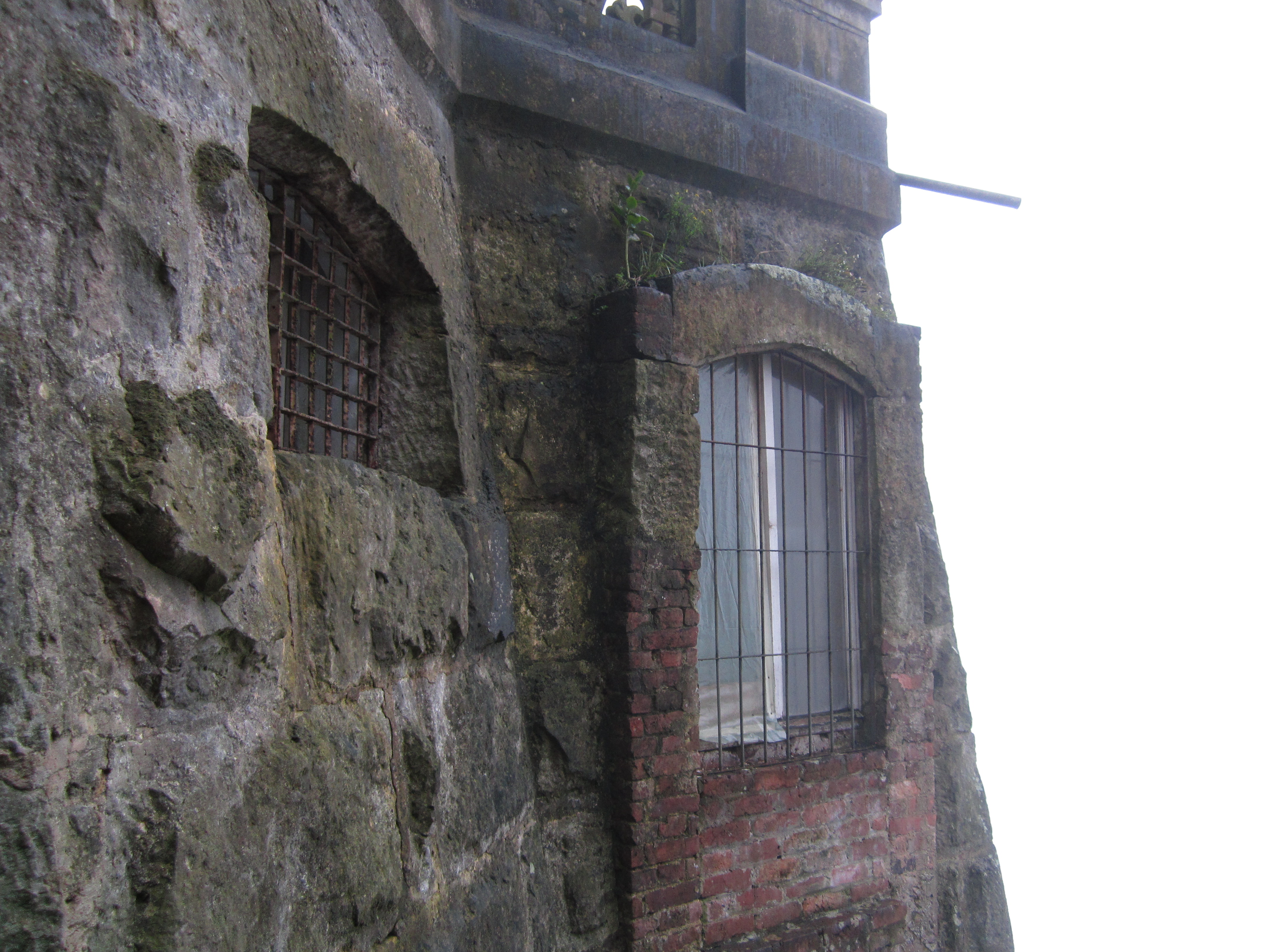
Base of Tequendama Falls Hotel
