= José Asunción Silva =

Colombian author (1865–1896)

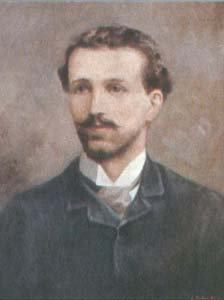
- Born: José Asunción Silva Gómez; 27 November 1865; Bogotá, Colombia
- Died: 23 May 1896 (aged 30); Bogotá, Colombia
- Occupations: Poet, author, novelist,political figure
- Writing career
- Period: Symbolism, Fin de Siecle and Modern poetry

José Asunción Silva (27 November 1865 in Bogotá – 23 May 1896 in Bogotá) was a Colombian poet and novelist. He is considered one of the leaders of Latin American Modern Poetry, following the paths of Baudelaire, Mallarmée and Verlaine.

A few critics related him with the Modernists, but recent studies from professors Klaus Meyer-Minnemann and María Dolores Jaramillo, supported on the total of his works, proves his place as a modern poet and not as a "modernist".

== Life ==
Born to a wealthy and educated Bogotá family, Asunción Silva led a comfortable life. When he was just ten years old, he wrote his first poems. In 1882, he traveled through England, Switzerland and France, and in Paris met with other French contemporary poets and artists, including Stéphane Mallarmé and Gustave Moreau. His trip to Europe would influence his style, as he incorporated many French themes. However, with the death of his father and the mounting financial difficulties of his family, José Asunción Silva found himself obligated to return to Colombia. Incapable of paying his family's enormous debts, Silva accepted a diplomatic post in Caracas. Once there, he was encouraged by his fellow writers to dedicate himself to his poetry. In 1892, his sister Elvira died. In 1895, many of Silva's works, including his principal works of poetry and prose, were lost in a shipwreck. He was, however, persuaded to recreate one of the works, De Sobremesa, from memory, but the losses of three brothers and one sister, and many inedit papers, poems, and novel took their toll nonetheless.

== Death ==
On the morning of 24 May 1896, he was found dead in his bed with a gun near his body; he had shot himself in the heart the evening of 23 May 1896. There were many reasons for his suicide, including the death of three brothers and one sister, the loss of almost all his unpublished works when his ship sank near a quay in the Caribbean Sea, and his difficult family debts. He was buried in the Central Cemetery in Bogotá.

His most important legacy is his poetry and literary works, published after his death, and the introduction of modern aesthetic canons to Colombian poetry. The house where he lived has been converted into a library and museum, the Silva Poetry House.

== Works ==
There has been a great deal of debate as to whether Silva was a precursor of Modernism or a fully Modern poet.

The poet Carranza praises Silva's principal influence on Modernist poets and poetry stating that:

"One of the remarkable contributions of Silva's poetry is the experimentation of meters, as he varied rhythms and accents, and played with stanzas and measures, with the aim of loosening up the rigidity of the traditional verse, putting it at the service of the new modulation, music, feelings and emotions he wanted to express. All this experimentation relates him with Modern Poetry. The revival and the use of the enneasyllable, a success that is often unfairly awarded to Ruben Dario, is one of his first contributions to Modern colombian poetry.".

Some of his work, such as the anthology Bitter Drops (Gotas Amargas) has been praised for its use of language and irreverent, rebellious use of everyday language, the skeptical, "bitterly" humorous nature of its content and its break with literary canons and social traditions. It is far away from the hispanic costumbrismo and modernismo.

The poem "Nocturno" (Nocturnal) was his most famous work, published posthumously in 1908. Written in free verse, the poem broke with the more classical mode of Spanish versification and showed many signs of symbolism as a modern poet. The poem itself is apparently written in a response to the death of Asunción Silva's sister. But also could be the elected symbolism of the ideal women followed by Dante or Petrarca.

Until 2016, José Asunción Silva's face appeared on the 5000 Colombian peso banknote, with on the reverse his complete "Nocturno" poem in micro-text. Later the bank paper was changed and accompanied by an other poem: "Melancholy".

== Works ==
- El libro de versos (published posthumously in 1923)
- De sobremesa (published in 1925; trans. In After-Dinner Conversation)
- Cuentos negros
- Las cartas
- Gotas amargas

== Silva seen as a Modern poet ==
- Meyer-Minnemann, Klaus. La novela hispanoamericana de fin de siglo.México: Fondo de Cultura Económica, 1991.
- Meyer-Minnemann, Klaus. Nietzsche y el alma moderna de José Fernández. Bogotá: Revista Casa Silva No 11, pp. 149-162.
- Jaramillo, María Dolores. José Asunción Silva, poeta y lector moderno. Bogotá: Ayala Editores, 2001.
