= Convento de la Popa =

Church in Cartagena de Indias, Colombia

Coordinates: 10.4192°N 75.5255°W

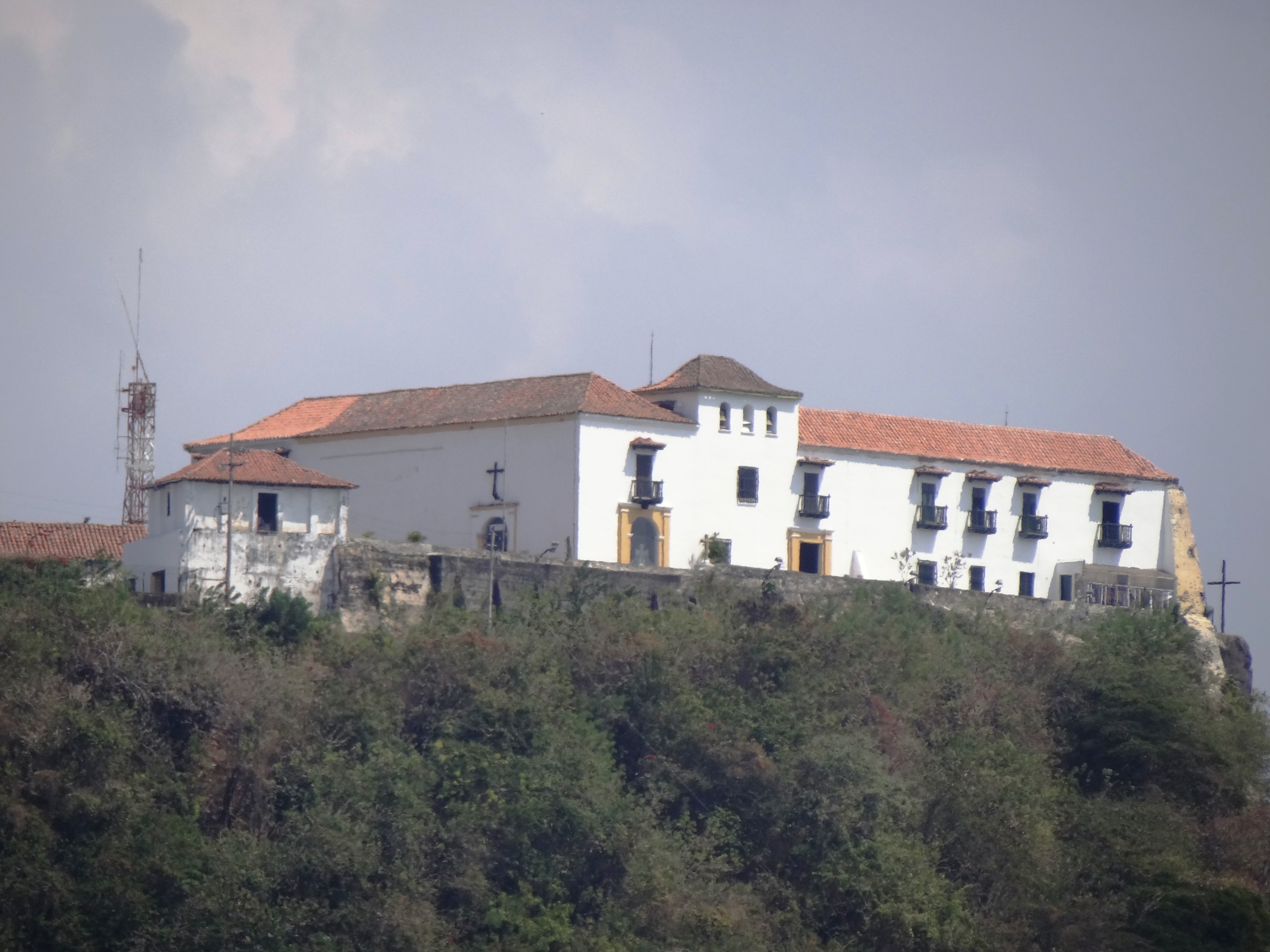
Far view of the convent

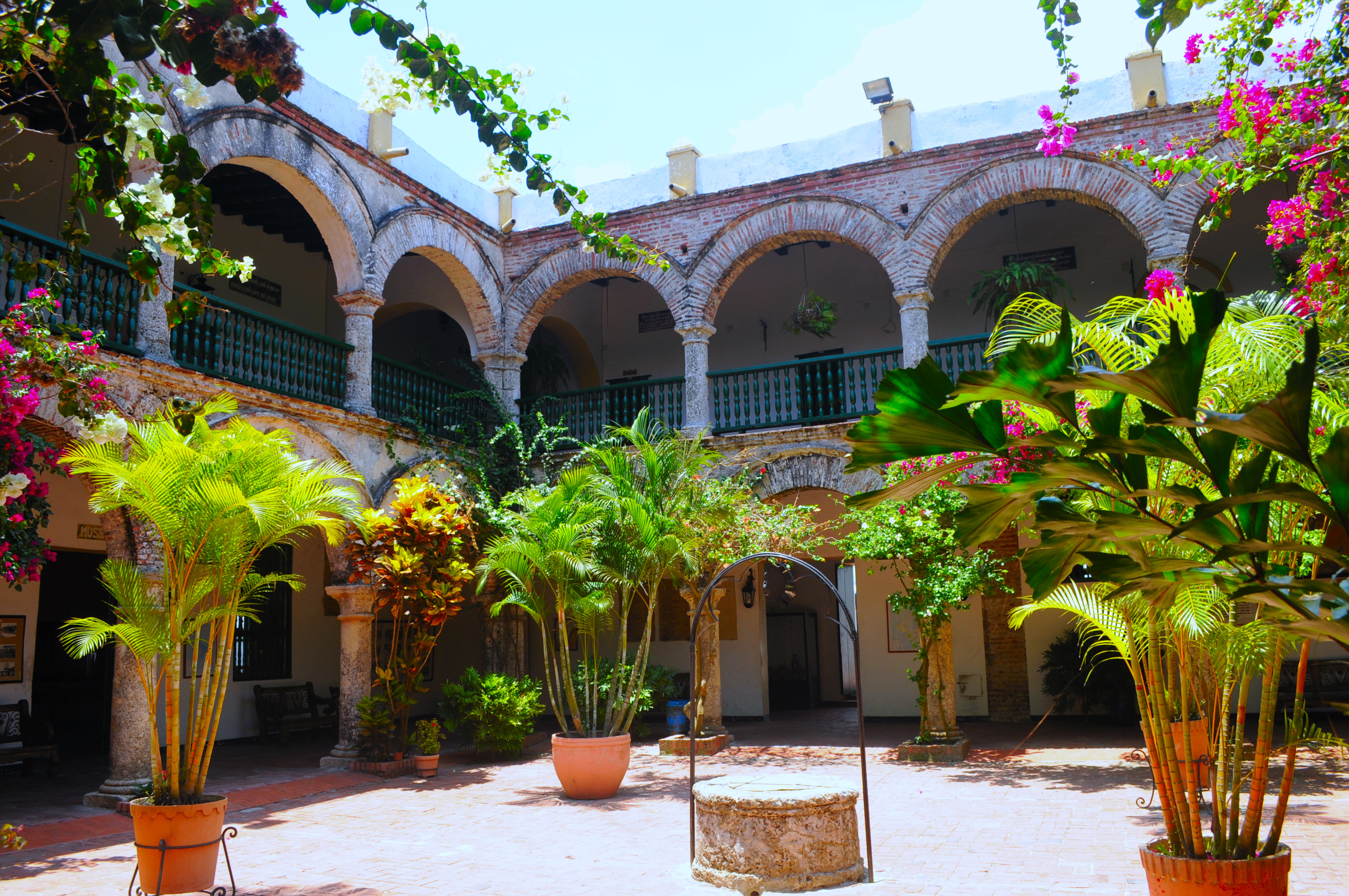
Cloister of the convent

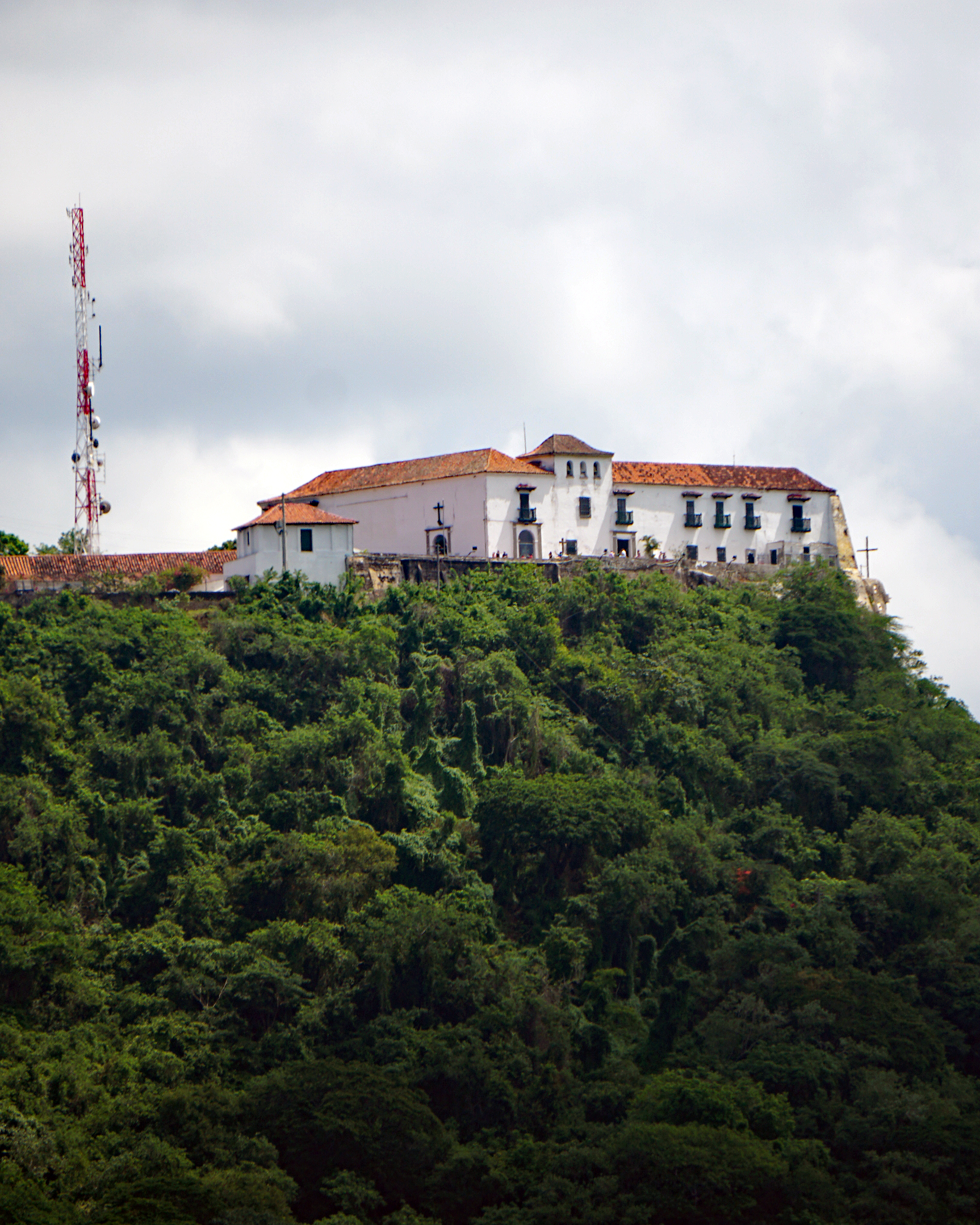
At top of the mount la Popa

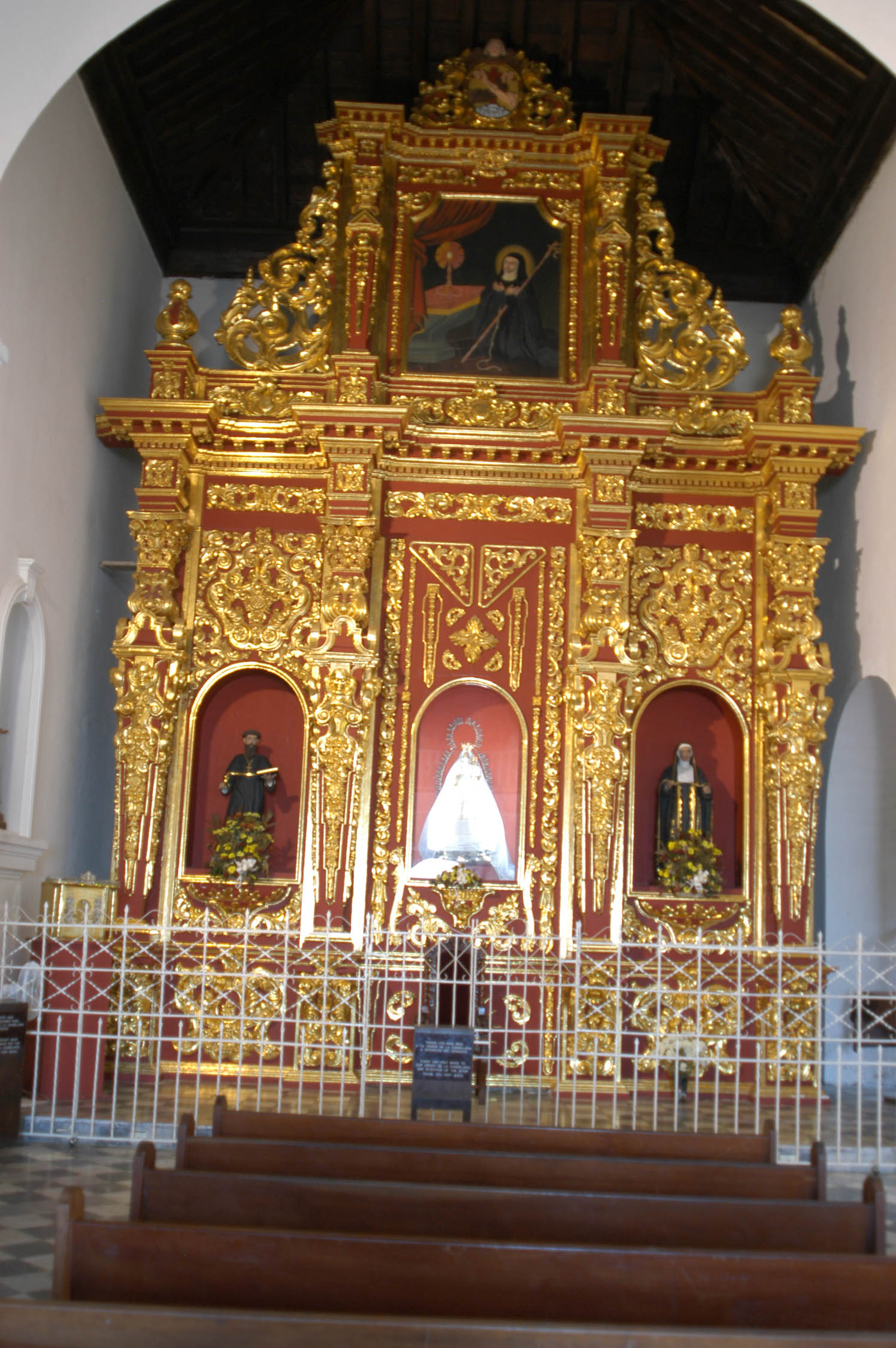
The altarpiece and the image of the Virgen de la Candelaria

The convent, cloister and chapel of Nuestra Señora de la Candelaria de la Popa are located at the top of Mount la Popa, in Cartagena de Indias, in Colombia. It is also called Convento de Santa Cruz de la Popa.

== History ==
The religious complex dates back to 1607, when the original wooden chapel and palm of the Popa was erected, thanks to the preaching of the Discalced Augustinian friar Vicente Mallol.

A year later, the convent was built, initially called Santa Cruz, and afterwards it was given the name of la Popa, to have the shape of a galley, whose stern is the extremity where the church currently stands.

A wealthy Neapolitan, Don Fabricio Sánchez, paid the expenses, and once the ecclesiastical and civil procedures of rigor were fulfilled, Fray Alonso de la Cruz Paredes, of the order of the Augustinian Recollects, was named as superior of the convent of La Popa.

The chronicle says that while Friar Alonso de la Cruz Paredes in the convent of the Candelaria of Ráquira (a town of the Colombian Andean area), the Blessed Virgin appeared to him and ordered him to build a church on the hill closest to Cartagena, in order to return the Christian faith to this land, in which the legend says, inhabited an evil spirit, in the form of a goat, to which the mulattoes worshiped under the direction of the native Luis Andrea, who ended his days in a cell of the Inquisition.

The friar fulfilled his mission and threw the animal from the top of the hill. Since then, the Cartagena people call the precipice, the Salto del Cabrón, in allusion to the goat.

By 1612 the convent was almost finished and 15,000 ducats had been invested in it, a very respectable sum at the time. The construction took about 6 or 7 years to finish.

Unfortunately, there are few precise data on the convent, since the historical archives have completely disappeared because of the invasions it has undergone. From its beginnings, Popa has been the target of all eyes, including that of the pirates, who considered it as a fortified castle that had to be taken somehow. In 1585 the famous English pirate Francis Drake assaulted the Heroic City with a fleet of 23 ships and a force of 2,500 men. The attacks continued, this time affecting the convent of the Stern.

By the time the convent was attacked, Cartagena had already built its famous and imposing walls, which were its salvation; La Popa, on the other hand, had only the advantage of being withdrawn and raised above sea level; Something of this served her not to be totally devastated, although after each attack she was left to invest in it large sums of money in reparations.

In the course of the War of Independence, the convent of La Popa was a theater of heroic feats, such as the one carried out on the night of November 11, 1815, when the surprise assault of the Spanish besieging troops of Pablo Morillo was rejected.

During the Republic, the Augustinians were forced to leave the convent, and it was abandoned until it was used as a barracks. In fact, when the liberating troops entered Cartagena, Simón Bolívar settled there with his regiment. Tradition tells that a cannonball, fired from the Castle of San Felipe de Barajas, passed a few centimeters from the head of the Liberator, who was leaning in a window of the high floor of the convent.

Then, in 1961 the convent and the hermitage were returned to the Augustinians. At the moment the convent houses the Religious Museum, that can be visited along with the formidable cloister.

In February, the feast of the Virgen de la Candelaria de La Popa is celebrated. From the dawn of February 2, crowds of devotees make a pilgrimage on foot to the top of the hill of Popa.

== See also ==
- List of colonial buildings in Cartagena, Colombia
