= Tequendama Falls =

Waterfall in Colombia

- Salto del Tequendama
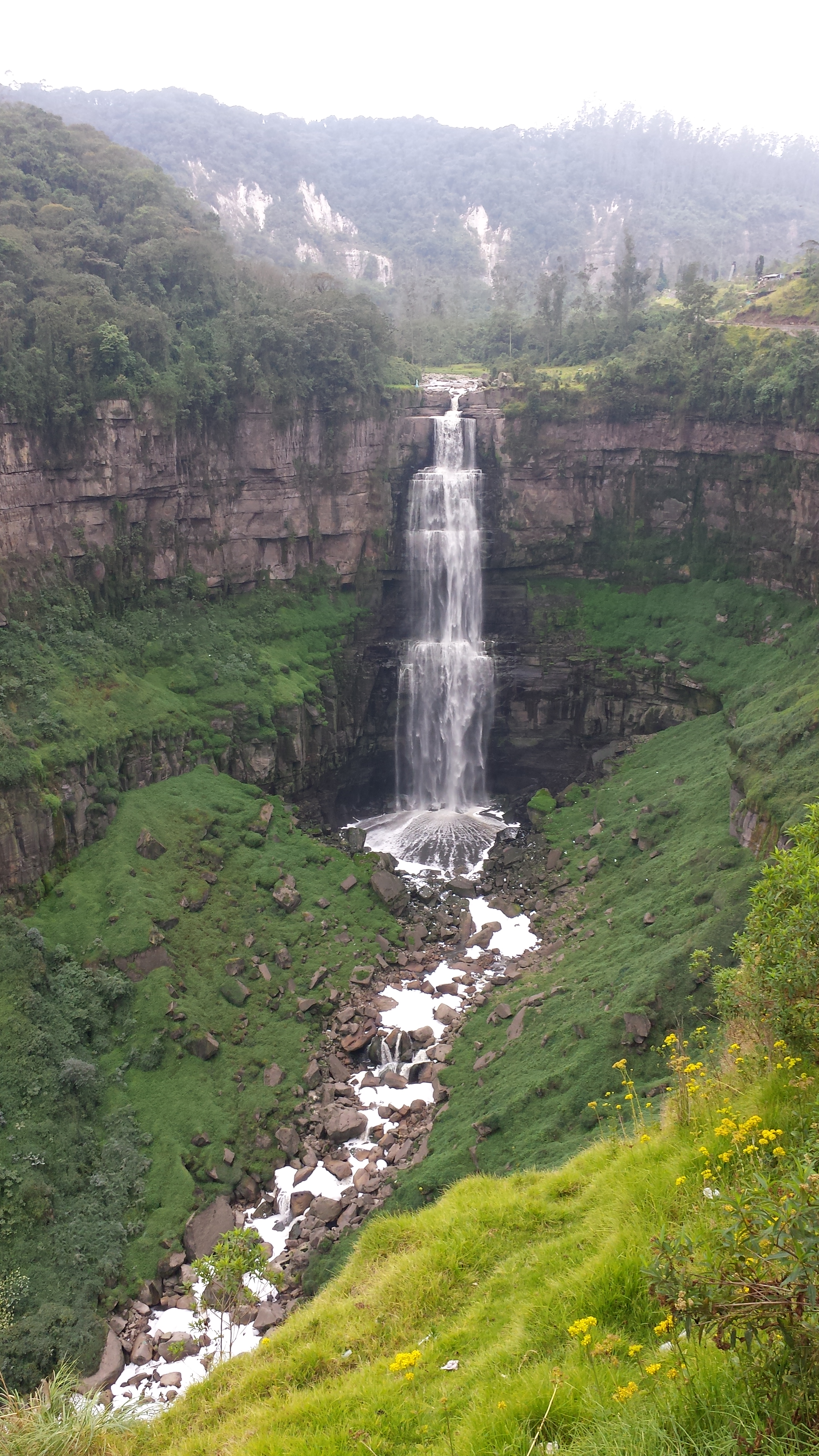
- Tequendama Falls

- Location within Colombia
- Location: Soacha, Cundinamarca, Colombia
- Coordinates: 4°34′27″N 74°17′36″W
- Elevation: 2,385 m (7,825 ft)
- Total height: 132 m (433 ft)
- Number of drops: 1
- Watercourse: Bogotá River

The Tequendama Falls (Spanish: Salto del Tequendama) is a 132 metres (433 ft) high waterfall of the Bogotá River, located 32 kilometres (20 mi) southwest of Bogotá in the municipality of Soacha. Established in approximately 10,000 BCE, El Abra and Tequendama were the first permanent settlements in Colombia. The falls were painted in 1854 by Frederic Edwin Church. One of the country's tourist attractions, the falls are located in a forested area 32 kilometres (20 mi) west of Bogotá. The river surges through a rocky gorge that narrows to about 18 metres (59 ft) at the brink of the 132 metres (433 ft) high falls. During the month of December the falls become completely dry. The falls, once a common site for suicides, may be reached by road from Bogotá.

== Muisca origin ==
In Chibcha, the nameTequendama translates to: "he who precipitated downward". According to the Muisca religion, the waterfall was created by the legendary hero Bochica, who used his staff to break the rock and release the water that covered the Bogotá savanna. According to another legend, during the Spanish conquest and evangelization of the Americas, in order to escape the new colonial order indigenous people of the area would jump off the Salto Del Tequendama and become eagles to fly to their freedom.

== Recovery of the falls and its surroundings ==
The river that feeds the falls is currently considered to be one of the most contaminated in the world.

"The Tequendama Falls has the dubious honor of being the largest wastewater falls in the world. Liquid wastes from the city are flushed untreated into the Bogotá River at the lower edge of the sabana, a few kilometers upstream of the Tequendama Falls. Downstream from Bogotá, the river is filled with sewage."

A historic hotel building, now a museum that overlooks the waterfall is undergoing restoration aided by the French government.

== See also ==
- List of waterfalls
- Muisca religion
- Bochica
- Tequendama Falls Museum
- Tequendamita Falls
- Tequendama
- List of waterfalls by type
- Lake Iguaque

== Bibliography ==
- Ocampo López, Javier (2007). Grandes culturas indígenas de América [Great indigenous cultures of the Americas] (in Spanish). Bogotá, Colombia: Plaza & Janes Editores Colombia S.A. pp. 1–238. ISBN 978-958-14-0368-4.
