= El Rosal, Cundinamarca =

El Rosal
- Municipality and town
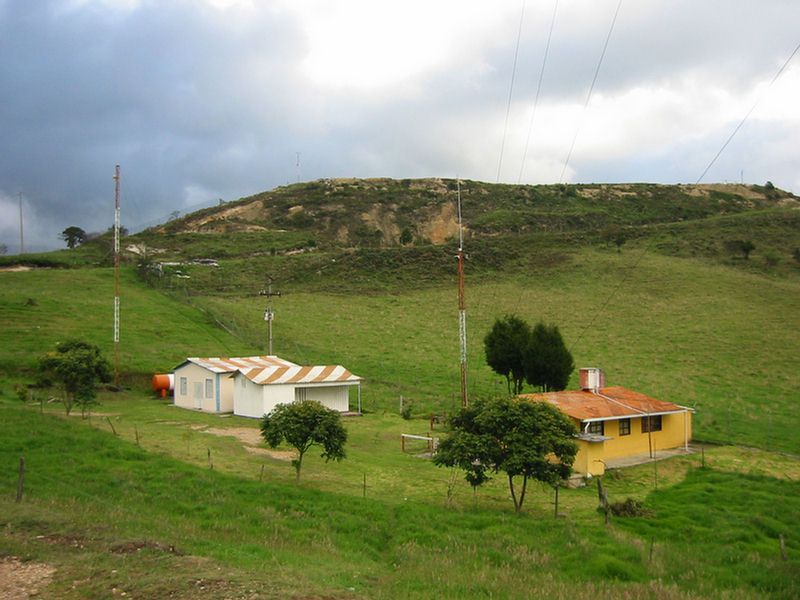
- Seismological station in El Rosal

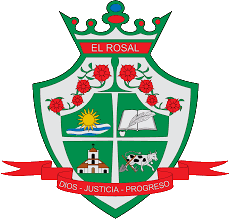
- Flag Coat of arms

- Location of the municipality and town inside Cundinamarca Department of Colombia

- Location in Colombia
- Coordinates: 4°51′7″N 74°15′46″W
- Country: Colombia
- Department: Cundinamarca
- Province: Western Savanna Province
- Founded: 28 March 1903
- Founder: Ana Vicenta González

Government
  - Mayor: Hugo Orlando Arévalo Pulído (2016-2019)

Area
  - Municipality and town: 87.21 km^{2} (33.67 sq mi)
  - Urban: 0.95 km^{2} (0.37 sq mi)
- Elevation: 2,685 m (8,809 ft)

Population (2018 census)
  - Municipality and town: 22,065
  - Density: 253.0/km^{2} (655.3/sq mi)
  - Urban: 18,958
  - Urban density: 20,000/km^{2} (52,000/sq mi)
- Time zone: UTC-5 (Colombia Standard Time)
- Website: Official website

El Rosal (Spanish pronunciation: [el roˈsal]) is a municipality and town of Colombia in the Western Savanna Province, part of the department of Cundinamarca. El Rosal is situated on the Bogotá savanna with its urban centre at an altitude of 2,685 metres (8,809 ft) and a distance of 20 kilometres (12 mi) from the capital Bogotá. It is part of the Metropolitan Area of Bogotá. El Rosal borders Subachoque in the northeast, San Francisco in the northwest, Madrid in the southeast and Facatativá in the southwest.

== History ==
The area of Subachoque, of which El Rosal was a part until 1903, in the times before the Spanish conquest, was inhabited by the Muisca. The zipa of Bacatá ruled over Subachoque. The Panche lived to the west of Subachoque and when the conquistadores arrived, they took advantage of the situation and entered the Muisca territories. Subachoque and El Rosal were submitted by Nicolás de Federman in 1538.

The Muisca agriculture consisted of potatoes, maize, coca, arracacha, sweet potatoes, tubers and chungua.

Modern El Rosal was founded on March 28, 1903 by Ana Vicenta González.

== Economy ==
A large percentage of this agricultural community is employed by large scale flower growers in the production of roses, carnations, Peruvian lilies and other varieties of flowers. Other crops which contribute to the economy are potatoes, carrots, corn, sweetpeas, string beans and herbs. Wheat was a major crop until the 1930s when the price fell and made it economically unfeasible to continue planting it. Dairy farms, meat cattle, goats and horses are also vital parts of the El Rosal economy.
