= Zipacón =

- Municipality and town
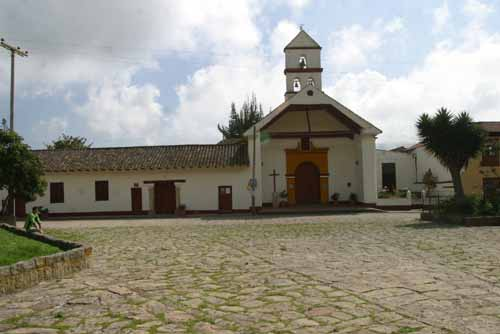
- Central square and church

- Flag Seal

- Location of the municipality and town of Zipacón inside Cundinamarca Department of Colombia

- Location in Colombia
- Coordinates: 4°45′36″N 74°22′47″W
- Country: Colombia
- Department: Cundinamarca
- Province: Western Savanna Province
- Founded: 5 July 1561
- Founder: José Antonio Rubio

Government
  - Mayor: Gustavo Cortés Camacho (2016-2019)

Area
  - Municipality and town: 70 km^{2} (27 sq mi)
- Elevation: 2,550 m (8,370 ft)

Population (2016)
  - Municipality and town: 5,570
  - Density: 80/km^{2} (210/sq mi)
  - Urban: 2,081
- Time zone: UTC-5 (Colombia Standard Time)
- Website: Official website

Zipacón (Spanish pronunciation: [sipaˈkon]) is a municipality and town of Colombia in the Western Savanna Province, part of the department of Cundinamarca. The urban centre of Zipacón is situated at an altitude of 2,550 metres (8,370 ft) on the Bogotá savanna, the southern flatlands of the Altiplano Cundiboyacense in the Eastern Ranges of the Colombian Andes. Zipacón borders Anolaima, Facatativá, La Mesa and Bojacá.

== Etymology ==
The name Zipacón comes from Muysccubun and means "crying of the zipa".

== History ==
In the times before the Spanish conquest, Zipacón was inhabited by the Muisca, organised in their loose Muisca Confederation. Zipacón was the site of meditation for the zipa. The settlement was at the border with the Panche, eternal enemies of the Muisca. It was in Zipacón where the Panche invaded when the Spanish conquistadors were conquering the Bogotá savanna.

The oldest evidences for agriculture of potatoes on the Bogotá savanna has been unearthed in Zipacón and dated at 3200 years BP. The settlement was inhabited since the Herrera Period, at least since 3270 BP. Rock art has been discovered in Zipacón.

Modern Zipacón was founded on July 5, 1561, by José Antonio Rubio.

== Economy ==
Main economical activities of Zipacón are agriculture and livestock farming.

== Gallery ==
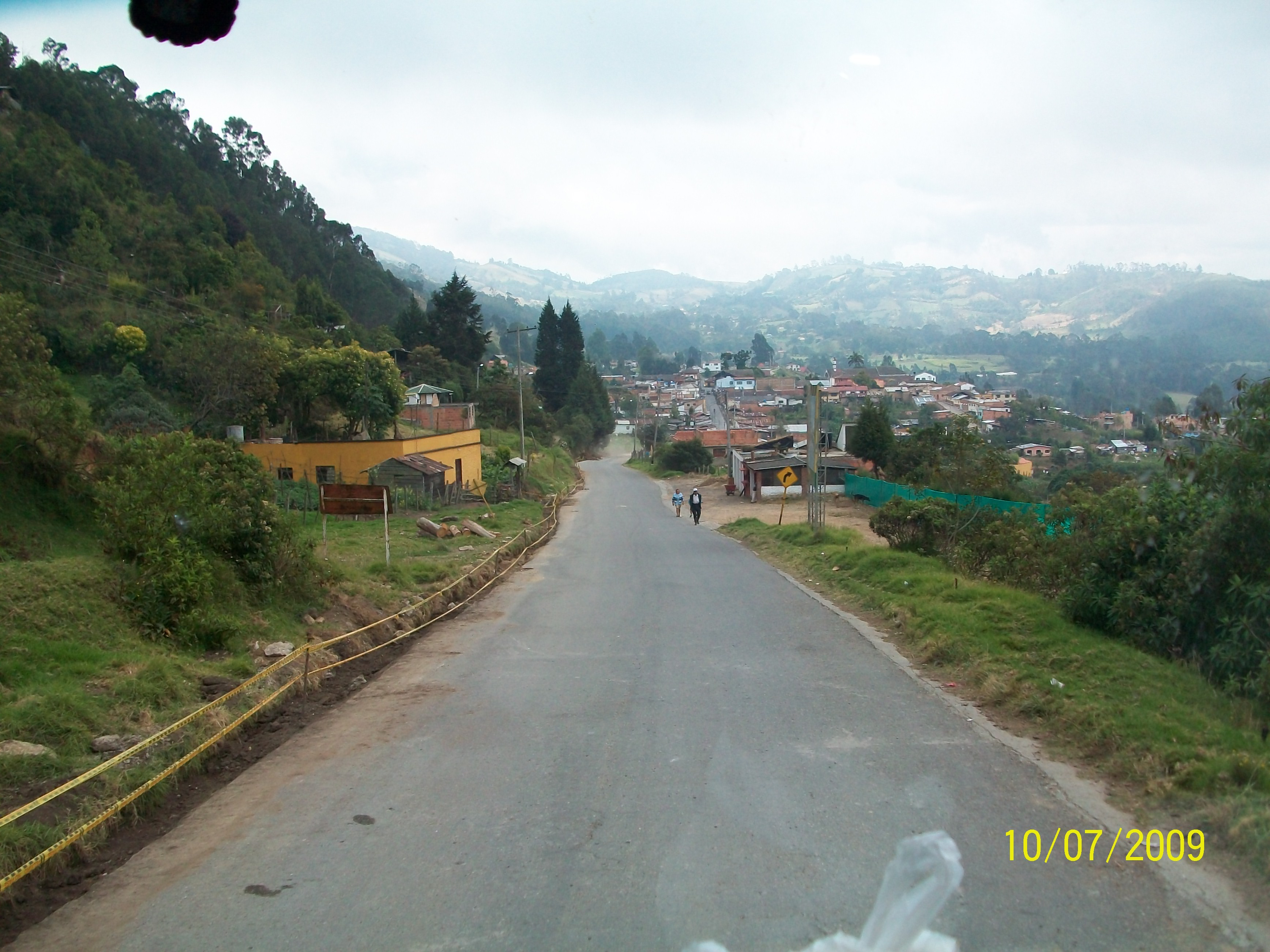
Road to Zipacón

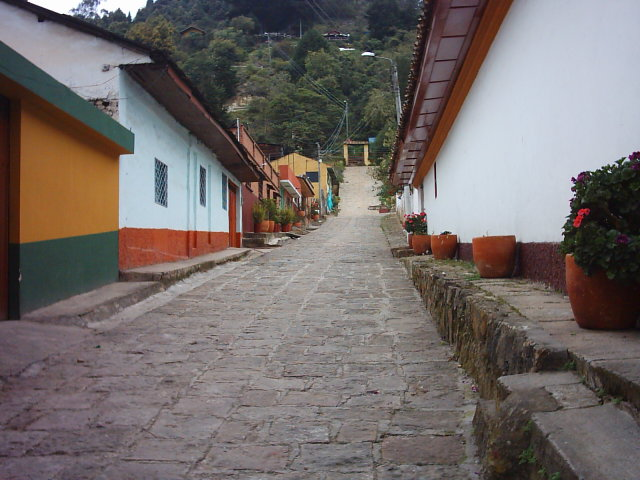
Street in Zipacón

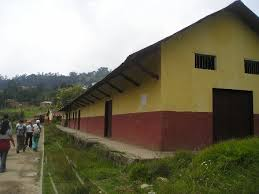
Farm

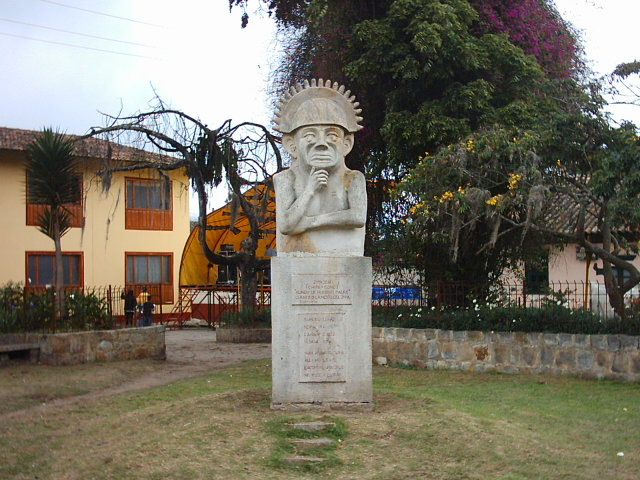
Statue of meditating zipa

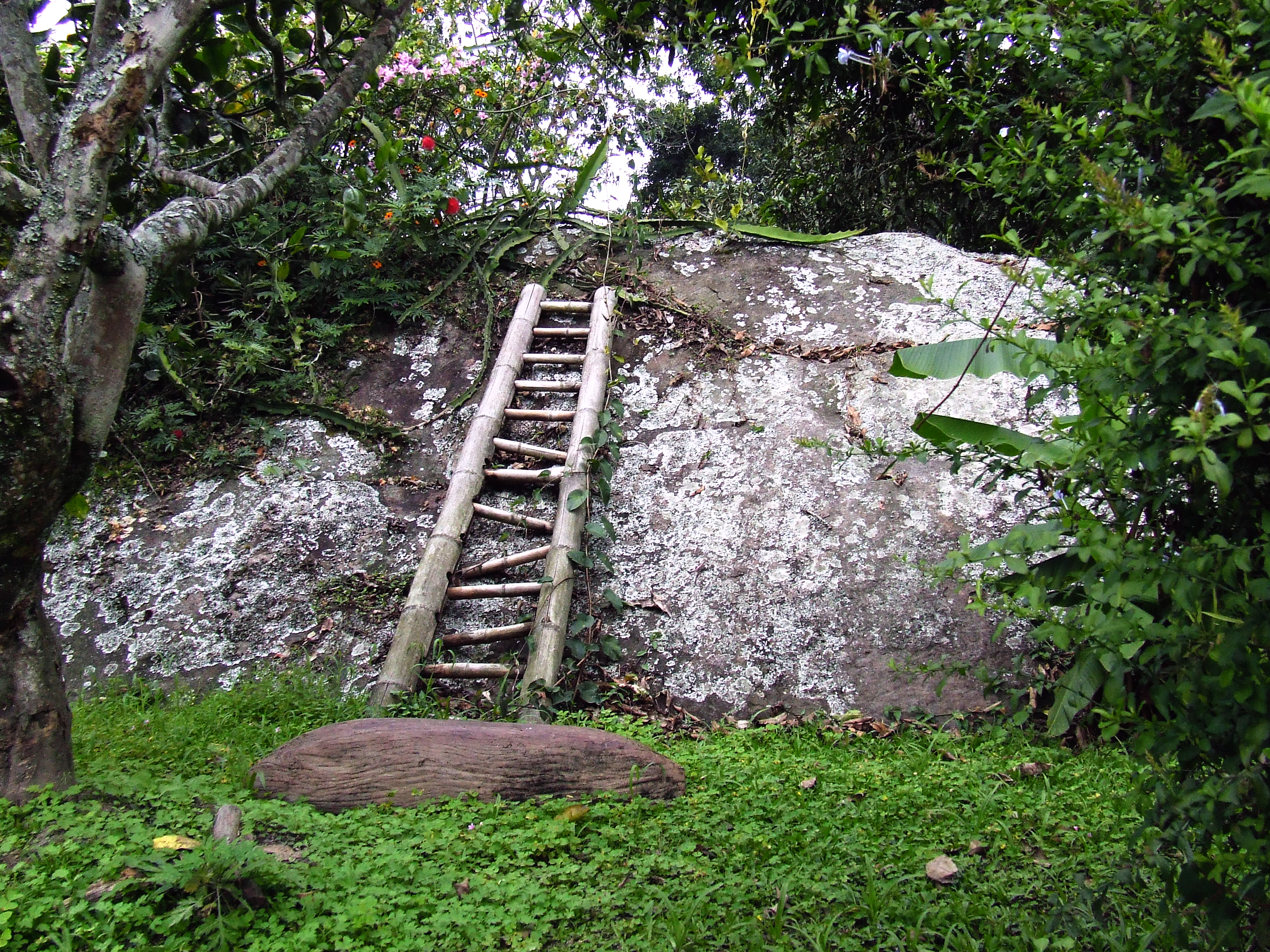
Rural Zipacón

== Bibliography ==
- García, Jorge Luis (2012), The Foods and crops of the Muisca: a dietary reconstruction of the intermediate chiefdoms of Bogotá (Bacatá) and Tunja (Hunza), Colombia (M.A.) (PDF) (M.A.), University of Central Florida, pp. 1–201, archived from the original (PDF) on 2014-05-03
- López Estupiñán, Laura (2011), Topando piedras, sumercé. Narraciones en torno a las piedras de Iza y Gámeza, Boyacá, Colombia - Bumping into stones, mister. Tales around the stones of Iza and Gámeza, Boyacá, Colombia (M.A.) (M.A.) (in Spanish), vol. 2, Rupestreweb
- Martínez Celis, Diego; Botiva Contreras, Álvaro (2004a), Manual de arte rupestre de Cundinamarca - Manual of rock art of Cundinamarca (in Spanish), ICANH, pp. 1–60, ISBN 958-8181-07-0
- Martínez Celis, Diego; Botiva Contreras, Álvaro (2004b), Introducción al arte rupestre (in Spanish), ICANH, pp. 1–28
- Muñoz Castiblanco, Guillermo (2006), Pinturas rupestres en el Altiplano Cundiboyacense, Colombia - concentración y diversidad en la Sabana de Bogotá: Municipio de Suacha-Sibaté Cundinamarca - Rock paintings on the Altiplano Cundiboyacense, Colombia - concentration and diversity on the Bogotá savanna: municipality of Soacha-Sibaté, Cundinamarca (in Spanish), pp. 1–22
- Nieto Escalante, Juan Antonio; Sepulveda Fajardo, Claudia Inés; Sandoval Sáenz, Luis Fernando; Siachoque Bernal, Ricardo Fabian; Fajardo Fajardo, Jair Olando; Martínez Díaz, William Alberto; Bustamante Méndez, Orlando; Oviedo Calderón, Diana Rocio (2010), Geografía de Colombia - Geography of Colombia (in Spanish), Bogotá, Colombia: Instituto Geográfico Agustín Codazzi, pp. 1–367, ISBN 978-958-8323-38-1
