= Bojacá =

- Municipality and town
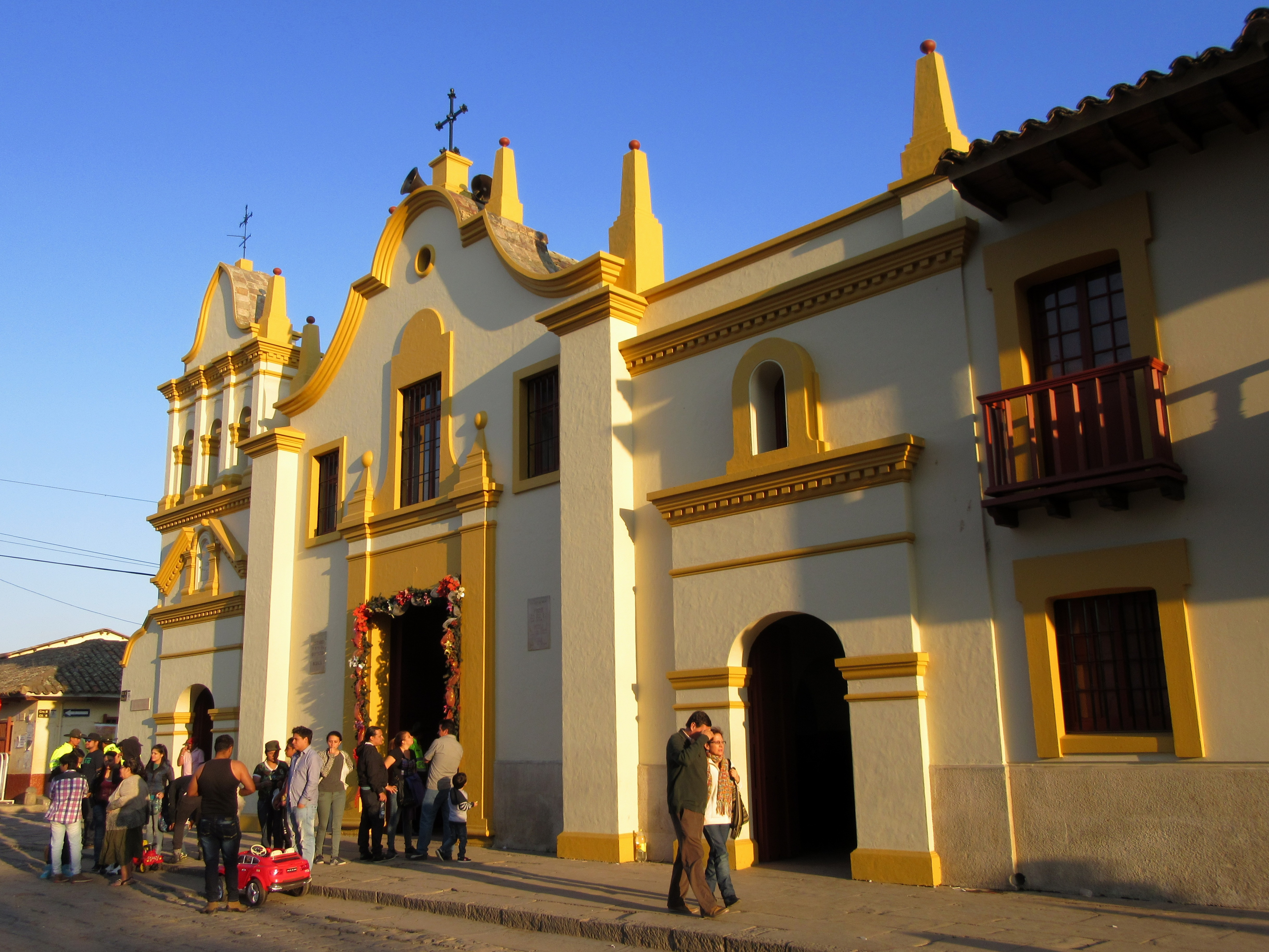
- Church of Bojacá

- Flag Coat of arms

- Location of the municipality and town inside Cundinamarca department of Colombia

- Location in Colombia
- Coordinates: 4°44′1″N 74°20′32″W
- Country: Colombia
- Department: Cundinamarca
- Province: Western Savanna Province
- Founded: 16 October 1537
- Founder: Gonzalo Jiménez de Quesada

Government
  - Mayor: Juan Carlos Gaitán Chiriví (2016–2019)

Area
  - Municipality and town: 109 km^{2} (42 sq mi)
  - Urban: 40 km^{2} (15 sq mi)
- Elevation: 2,598 m (8,524 ft)

Population (2015)
  - Municipality and town: 11,254
  - Density: 103/km^{2} (267/sq mi)
  - Urban: 9,256
- Time zone: UTC-5 (Colombia Standard Time)
- Website: Official website

Bojacá is a municipality and town of the Western Savanna Province, Colombia in the department of Cundinamarca. The urban centre is situated at an altitude of 2,598 metres (8,524 ft) on the Bogotá savanna at 40 kilometres (25 mi) from the capital Bogotá. The municipality borders Zipacón, Madrid and Facatativá in the north, Madrid and Mosquera in the east, Soacha and San Antonio del Tequendama in the south and Tena, La Mesa and Zipacón in the west.

== Etymology ==
The name Bojacá comes from Chibcha and means "Purple enclosure".

== History ==
The area around Bojacá was inhabited at least since 3410 years BP (1400 BCE), evidenced by archaeological excavations from the Herrera Period performed in Aguazuque, Zipacón and around Lake Herrera, Mosquera. The territories were already important in the times before the Spanish conquest when Bojacá was part of the Muisca Confederation; a loose confederation of rulers of the Muisca.

On his expedition to El Dorado and after conquering the Muisca, conquistador Gonzalo Jiménez de Quesada founded modern Bojacá on October 16, 1537.

== Economy ==
Main economical activities of Bojacá are agriculture and livestock farming. Among the agricultural products cultivated are potatoes, carrots, maize, lettuce and fruits as blackberries, strawberries, prunes and the typical Colombian fruits uchuva, tree tomato and granadilla.

== Climate ==
Climate data for Bojacá (Acapulco), elevation 2,650 m (8,690 ft), (1981–2010)
Month	Jan	Feb	Mar	Apr	May	Jun	Jul	Aug	Sep	Oct	Nov	Dec	Year
Mean daily maximum °C (°F)	16.1 (61.0)	16.1 (61.0)	16.0 (60.8)	16.0 (60.8)	16.1 (61.0)	16.1 (61.0)	15.7 (60.3)	15.8 (60.4)	16.3 (61.3)	16.0 (60.8)	16.0 (60.8)	15.9 (60.6)	16.0 (60.8)
Daily mean °C (°F)	13.0 (55.4)	13.2 (55.8)	13.2 (55.8)	13.4 (56.1)	13.4 (56.1)	13.1 (55.6)	12.7 (54.9)	12.9 (55.2)	13.0 (55.4)	13.1 (55.6)	13.1 (55.6)	12.9 (55.2)	13.1 (55.6)
Mean daily minimum °C (°F)	9.5 (49.1)	9.3 (48.7)	9.8 (49.6)	10.1 (50.2)	10.2 (50.4)	9.9 (49.8)	9.3 (48.7)	9.4 (48.9)	9.7 (49.5)	9.7 (49.5)	9.9 (49.8)	9.5 (49.1)	9.7 (49.5)
Average precipitation mm (inches)	43.4 (1.71)	54.8 (2.16)	77.4 (3.05)	111.9 (4.41)	87.8 (3.46)	44.5 (1.75)	38.4 (1.51)	35.1 (1.38)	63.1 (2.48)	105.3 (4.15)	91.3 (3.59)	70.9 (2.79)	778.2 (30.64)
Average precipitation days	7	7	11	13	12	10	10	9	10	13	12	9	115
Average relative humidity (%)	90	90	91	93	92	92	91	91	91	91	92	91	91
Source: Instituto de Hidrologia Meteorologia y Estudios Ambientales

== Gallery ==
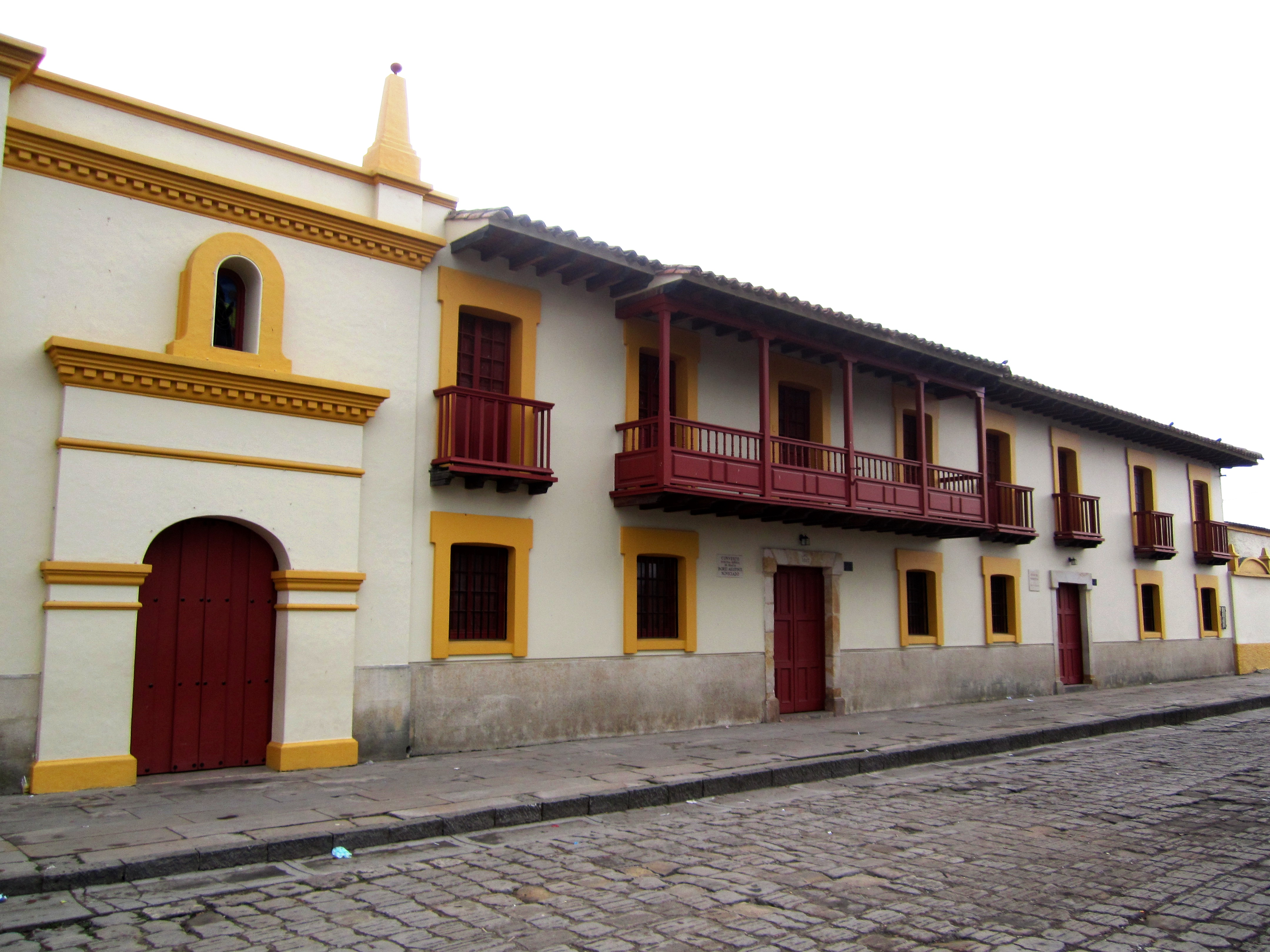
Central square

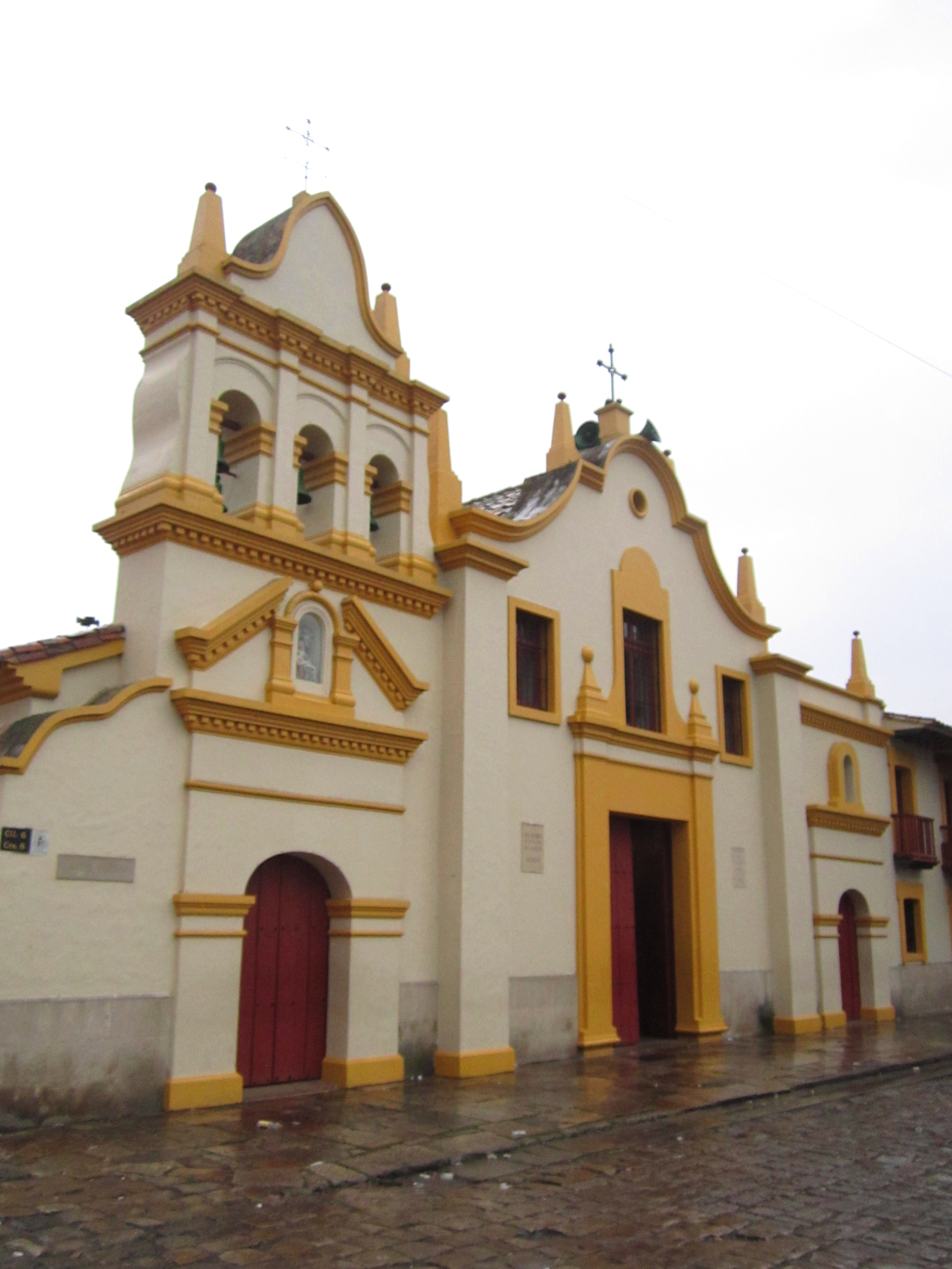
Church of Bojacá at the central square

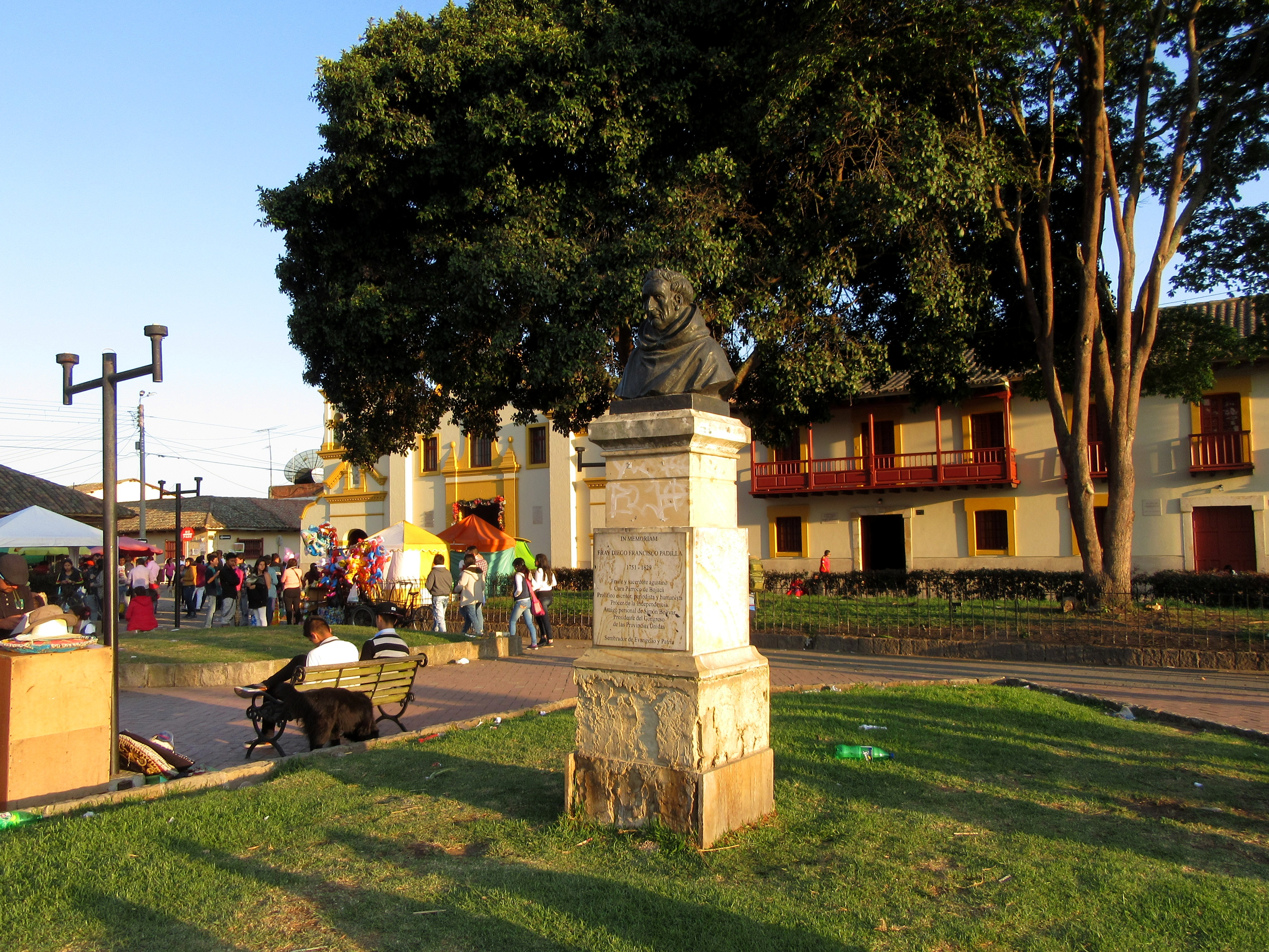
Buste of friar Diego Francisco Pinilla at the central square
