= Subachoque =

- Municipality and town
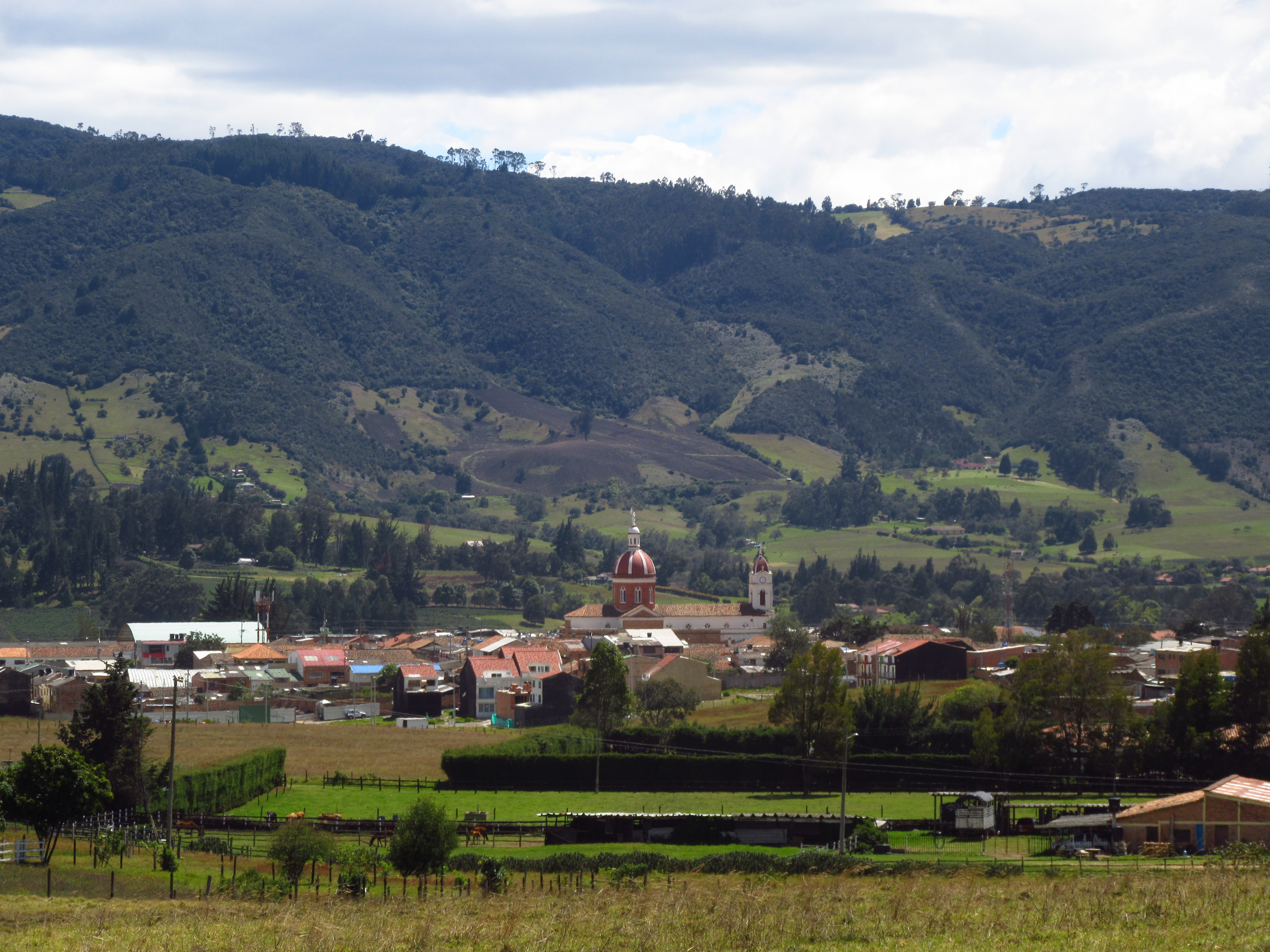
- Vue of Subachoque

- Flag Coat of arms

- Location of the municipality and town inside Cundinamarca Department of Colombia

- Location in Colombia
- Coordinates: 4°55′41″N 74°10′25″W
- Country: Colombia
- Department: Cundinamarca
- Province: Western Savanna Province
- Founded: 16 March 1774
- Founder: Jacinto Roque Salgado

Government
  - Mayor: Juan Guillermo Cortés Ballén (2016-2019)

Area
  - Municipality and town: 211.53 km^{2} (81.67 sq mi)
  - Urban: 0.813 km^{2} (0.314 sq mi)
- Elevation: 2,663 m (8,737 ft)

Population (2015)
  - Municipality and town: 16,117
  - Density: 76.193/km^{2} (197.34/sq mi)
  - Urban: 6,061
- Time zone: UTC-5 (Colombia Standard Time)
- Website: Official website

Subachoque is a municipality and town of Colombia in the Western Savanna Province, part of the department of Cundinamarca. The municipality is situated on the Bogotá savanna with the urban centre at an altitude of 2,663 metres (8,737 ft) at a distance of 45 kilometres (28 mi) from the capital Bogotá. Subachoque is part of the Metropolitan Area of Bogotá and borders Zipaquirá, Tabio and Tenjo in the east, Zipaquirá and Pacho in the north, San Francisco and Supatá in the west and Madrid and El Rosal in the south. Subachoque is composed of 17 subdivisions: Altania, Canica Alta, Canica Baja, Cascajal, El Guamal, El Pantano, El Páramo, El Tobal, Galdámez, La Cuesta, La Pradera, La Unión, La Yegüera, Llanitos, Rincón Santo, Santa Rosa, Tibagota, El Valle.

== Etymology ==
The name Subachoque comes from Chibcha and means either "Work of the Sun" or "Farmfields of the front".

== History ==
In the times before the Spanish conquest, the area of Subachoque formed part of the Muisca Confederation, a loose confederation of different rulers of the Muisca. Subachoque was reigned by the zipa based in Bacatá.

Modern Subachoque was founded on March 16, 1774 by the priest Jacinto Roque Salgado. After the Spanish Crown gave the lands and allowance to Spanish families in order to colonize the area, the indigenous peoples that lived by the time in that area were relocated to other areas of Colombia or executed if they refused to be moved. Subachoque is one of the few towns in Colombia whose inhabitants are descendants mostly only from Spanish or European roots. During the iron production that took place at La pradera between 1850 and the early 1900s, the arrival of North Americans, British, French and Germans placed a genetical mark on the population of Subachoque.

The Subachoque area was also the site of the Battle of Campo Amalia, also known as the Battle of Subachoque, in 1861.

== Economy ==
Main economical activities of Subachoque are agriculture, livestock farming and small-scale mining. The most important agricultural products cultivated are potatoes, carrots, peas and fruits as peaches, pears, strawberries and apples.

== Geology ==
The Subachoque Formation is named after Subachoque.

== Born in Subachoque ==
- Nemesio Camacho, businessman and politician

== Climate ==
Climate data for Subachoque (Primavera La), elevation 2,560 m (8,400 ft), (1981–2010)
Month	Jan	Feb	Mar	Apr	May	Jun	Jul	Aug	Sep	Oct	Nov	Dec	Year
Mean daily maximum °C (°F)	18.9 (66.0)	18.5 (65.3)	18.4 (65.1)	18.9 (66.0)	18.6 (65.5)	17.7 (63.9)	17.1 (62.8)	17.9 (64.2)	18.4 (65.1)	18.4 (65.1)	18.1 (64.6)	18.6 (65.5)	18.3 (64.9)
Daily mean °C (°F)	11.2 (52.2)	11.8 (53.2)	11.4 (52.5)	12.1 (53.8)	12.2 (54.0)	12.0 (53.6)	11.2 (52.2)	11.7 (53.1)	11.6 (52.9)	11.4 (52.5)	11.2 (52.2)	10.7 (51.3)	11.6 (52.9)
Mean daily minimum °C (°F)	3.8 (38.8)	5.6 (42.1)	5.2 (41.4)	6.8 (44.2)	7.3 (45.1)	6.4 (43.5)	5.8 (42.4)	5.8 (42.4)	5.4 (41.7)	5.9 (42.6)	6.0 (42.8)	4.0 (39.2)	5.6 (42.1)
Average precipitation mm (inches)	29.8 (1.17)	41.5 (1.63)	65.2 (2.57)	100.7 (3.96)	103.5 (4.07)	62.9 (2.48)	54.9 (2.16)	53.0 (2.09)	70.9 (2.79)	113.6 (4.47)	93.1 (3.67)	47.6 (1.87)	836.8 (32.94)
Average precipitation days	8	10	12	16	17	14	15	14	13	17	14	10	158
Mean monthly sunshine hours	186.0	141.2	127.1	105.0	124.0	120.0	145.7	124.0	120.0	108.5	141.0	176.7	1,619.2
Mean daily sunshine hours	6.0	5.0	4.1	3.5	4.0	4.0	4.7	4.0	4.0	3.5	4.7	5.7	4.4
Source: Instituto de Hidrologia Meteorologia y Estudios Ambientales

== Gallery ==
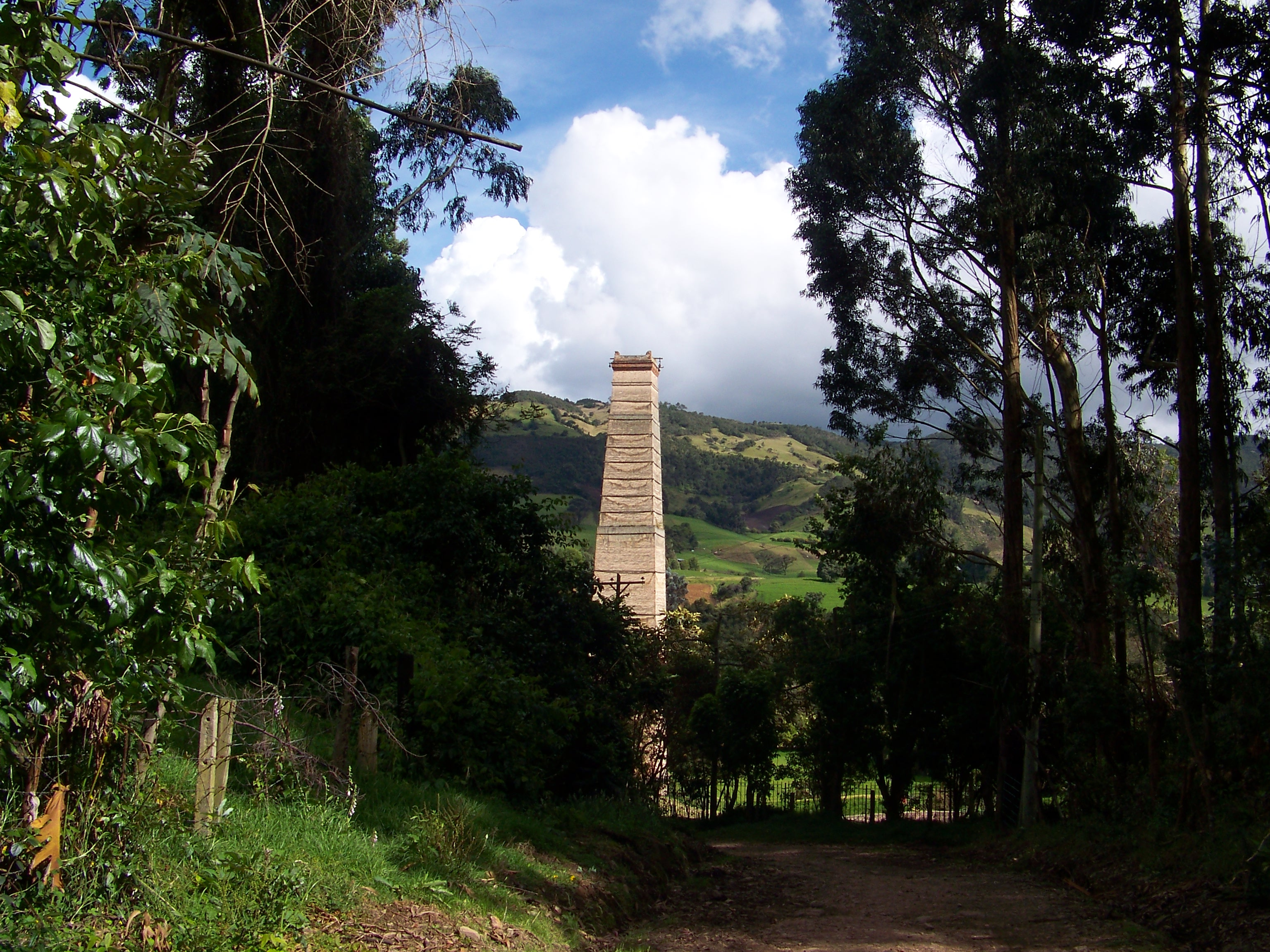
Antigua Ferrería de La Pradera monument

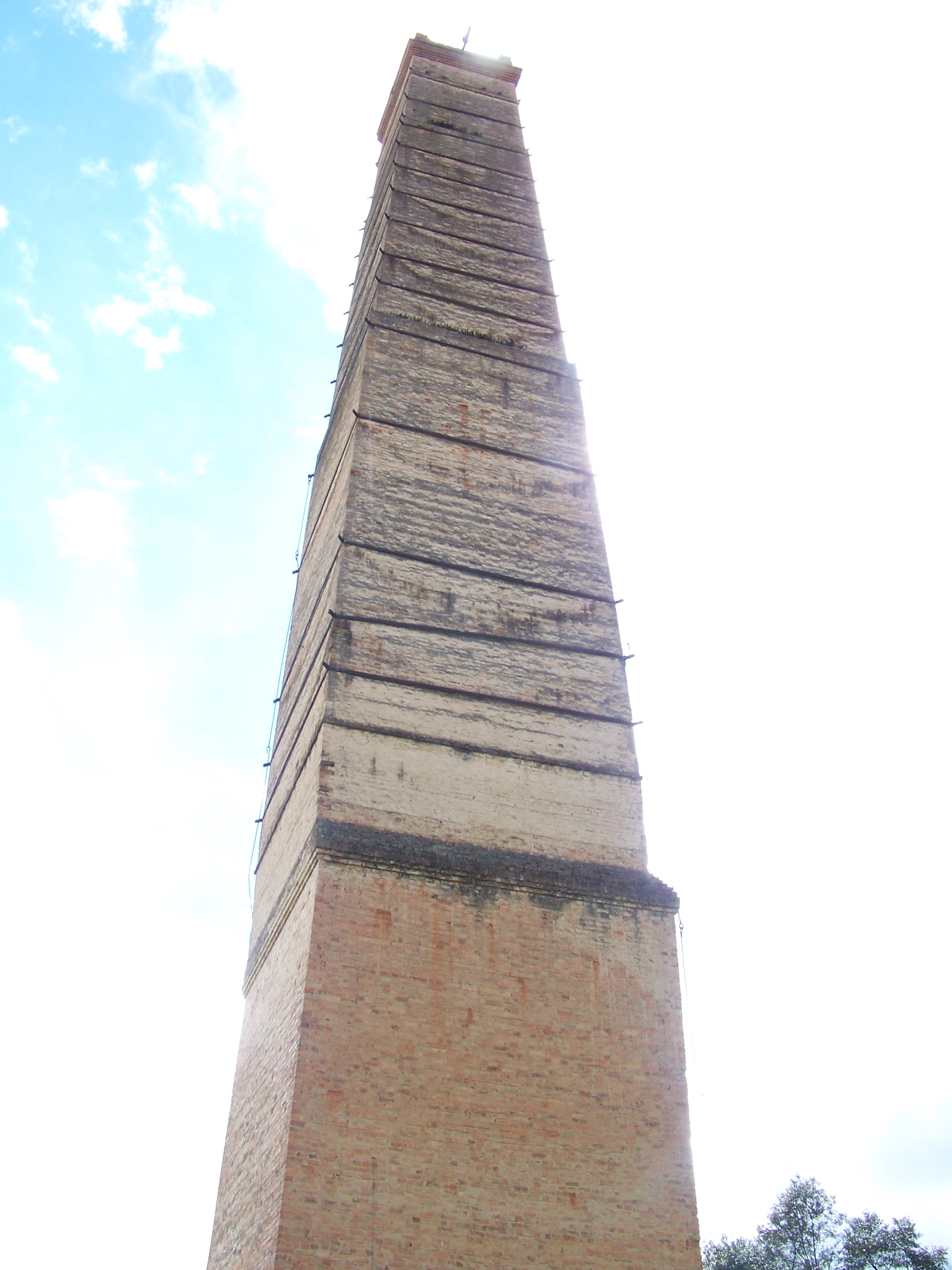
Antigua Ferrería de La Pradera monument
