= Western Savanna Province =

Western Savanna Province Provincia de Sabana Occidente
- Province
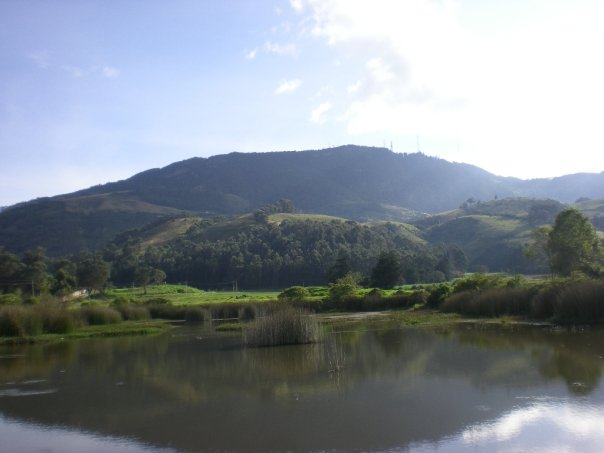
- Manjui Hill, Facatativá
- Etymology: Bogotá savanna
- Location of Western Savanna Province in Colombia
- Coordinates: 4°49′00″N 74°22′00″W
- Country: Colombia
- Department: Cundinamarca
- Capital: Facatativá
- Municipalities: 8

Area
  - Total: 932.51 km^{2} (360.04 sq mi)

Population (2015)
  - Total: 420,444
  - Density: 450.87/km^{2} (1,167.8/sq mi)
- Time zone: UTC−05:00 (COT)
- Indigenous groups: Muisca

Western Savanna Province is one of the 15 provinces in the Cundinamarca Department, Colombia.

== Subdivision ==
The Western Savanna province is subdivided into 8 municipalities:

Municipality bold is capital	Area km^{2}	Elevation (m) urban centre	Population 2015	Founded	Map
Bojacá	109	2598	11,254	1537	
Facatativá	158	2586	134,522	1600	
Funza	70	2548	75,350	1537	
Madrid	120.5	2554	77,627	1559	
Mosquera	107	2516	82,750	1861	
El Rosal	86.48	2685	17,254	1903	
Subachoque	211.53	2663	16,117	1774	
Zipacón	70	2550	5570	1561	
Total	932.51		420,444		
