= Mosquera, Cundinamarca =

Mosquera
- Municipality and city
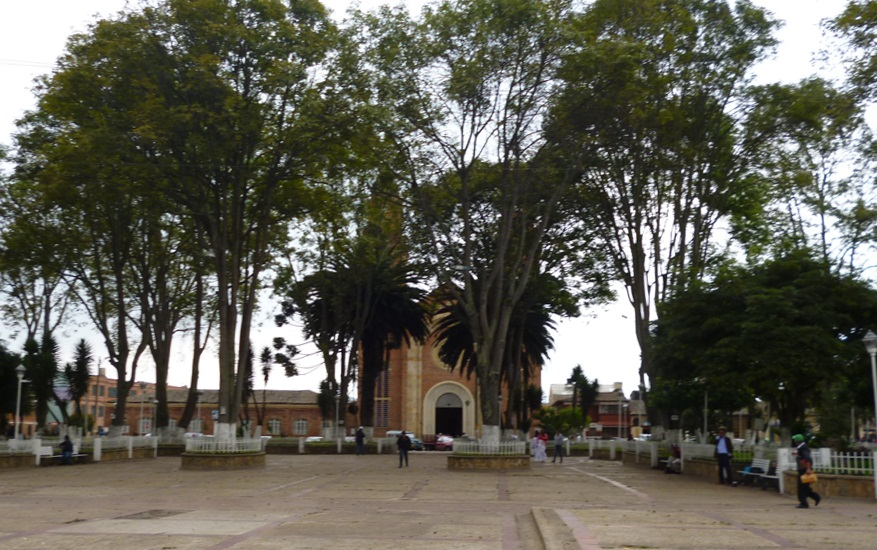
- Central square of Mosquera

- Flag Coat of arms

- Location of the municipality and town of Mosquera in the Cundinamarca Department of Colombia

- Location in Colombia
- Coordinates: 4°42′28″N 74°13′58″W
- Country: Colombia
- Department: Cundinamarca
- Province: Western Savanna Province
- Founded: 27 September 1861

Government
  - Mayor: Nelson Hernán Parra Laguna (2024-2027)

Area
  - Municipality and city: 105.9 km^{2} (40.9 sq mi)
  - Urban: 14.55 km^{2} (5.62 sq mi)
- Elevation: 2,516 m (8,255 ft)

Population (2018 census)
  - Municipality and city: 130,221
  - Density: 1,230/km^{2} (3,185/sq mi)
  - Urban: 128,012
  - Urban density: 8,798/km^{2} (22,790/sq mi)
- Demonym: Mosqueruno
- Time zone: UTC-5 (Colombia Standard Time)
- Area code: +1
- Website: Official website

Mosquera is a municipality of Colombia in the Western Savanna Province, part of the department of Cundinamarca. Mosquera is close to the capital Bogotá and is part of its metropolitan area. The urban centre of Mosquera is situated at an altitude of 2,516 metres (8,255 ft) on the Bogotá savanna. The municipality borders the localities Bosa and Fontibón of Bogotá in the east, Soacha in the south, Madrid and Funza in the north and Bojacá in the west.

== Etymology ==
Mosquera is named after its founder, former president of Colombia Tomás Cipriano de Mosquera, who in 1861 separated Mosquera from Funza.

== History ==
Mosquera is close to Lake Herrera, a remnant lake of the large Pleistocene Lake Humboldt that existed on the Bogotá savanna until approximately 30,000 years BP. The archaeological findings around Lake Herrera date to the preceramic period, predating the Herrera Period, named after the lake.

The Muisca established their civilisation typically as of 800 AD. They were an advanced culture and performed agriculture on the high plains of the savanna. In the Muisca times maize, potatoes, arracacha, quinoa, sweet potatoes, yuca, peppers, tomatoes, beans and pumpkins were cultivated in Mosquera. The Muisca were predominantly farmers and traders and their economy was based on the extraction of salt from the northern parts of the Bogotá savanna. Fruits and other agricultural products growing in different climates were traded on the frequent markets of the Muisca. In Mosquera pineapples, avocadoes, guanabanas, ice-cream beans, pitahayas and guayabas were the fruits traded with warmer climates. Tobacco also came from more tropical regions while cotton was traded with the colder climate Lache.

Funza, of which Mosquera formed the southern part until 1861, was founded by conquistador Gonzalo Jiménez de Quesada who arrived in the region on April 20, 1537.

Presently, Mosquera is a satellite town of the capital Bogotá and has grown significantly in recent years.

In 2022, an unusual type of white foam covered the town. Residents reported that it produced an awful smell and that it had covered large parts of the municipality. While many locals were forced to get inhalers no effects on public health were recorded.

== Climate ==
Mosquera has a subtropical highland climate (Köppen Cfb) with cool temperatures throughout the year.

Climate data for Mosquera (Tibaitata), elevation 2,543 m (8,343 ft), (1981–2010)
| Month | Jan | Feb | Mar | Apr | May | Jun | Jul | Aug | Sep | Oct | Nov | Dec | Year |
|---|---|---|---|---|---|---|---|---|---|---|---|---|---|
| Mean daily maximum °C (°F) | 20.1 (68.2) | 20.1 (68.2) | 20.0 (68.0) | 19.6 (67.3) | 19.4 (66.9) | 18.9 (66.0) | 18.6 (65.5) | 18.9 (66.0) | 19.4 (66.9) | 19.4 (66.9) | 19.4 (66.9) | 19.7 (67.5) | 19.5 (67.1) |
| Daily mean °C (°F) | 12.8 (55.0) | 13.2 (55.8) | 13.4 (56.1) | 13.7 (56.7) | 13.7 (56.7) | 13.4 (56.1) | 13.0 (55.4) | 13.0 (55.4) | 13.0 (55.4) | 13.1 (55.6) | 13.2 (55.8) | 12.9 (55.2) | 13.2 (55.8) |
| Mean daily minimum °C (°F) | 4.9 (40.8) | 5.9 (42.6) | 7.0 (44.6) | 8.2 (46.8) | 8.3 (46.9) | 7.5 (45.5) | 6.9 (44.4) | 6.7 (44.1) | 6.3 (43.3) | 7.1 (44.8) | 7.3 (45.1) | 5.9 (42.6) | 6.8 (44.2) |
| Average precipitation mm (inches) | 22.3 (0.88) | 35.8 (1.41) | 57.2 (2.25) | 92.8 (3.65) | 83.5 (3.29) | 59.1 (2.33) | 40.9 (1.61) | 38.1 (1.50) | 49.6 (1.95) | 85.9 (3.38) | 79.3 (3.12) | 46.1 (1.81) | 690.6 (27.19) |
| Average precipitation days | 7.0 | 10 | 14 | 18 | 20 | 16 | 16 | 14 | 15 | 18 | 16 | 11 | 174 |
| Average relative humidity (%) | 82 | 81 | 83 | 84 | 84 | 82 | 81 | 80 | 81 | 84 | 85 | 84 | 83 |
| Mean monthly sunshine hours | 192.2 | 152.4 | 139.5 | 111.0 | 111.6 | 114.0 | 136.4 | 145.7 | 132.0 | 133.3 | 132.0 | 167.4 | 1,667.5 |
| Mean daily sunshine hours | 6.2 | 5.4 | 4.5 | 3.7 | 3.6 | 3.8 | 4.4 | 4.7 | 4.4 | 4.3 | 4.4 | 5.4 | 4.6 |
Source: Instituto de Hidrologia Meteorologia y Estudios Ambientales

== Born in Mosquera ==
- Olimpo López (1918–2015), pastry chef and creator of the Chocoramo (Productos Ramo)

== Gallery ==
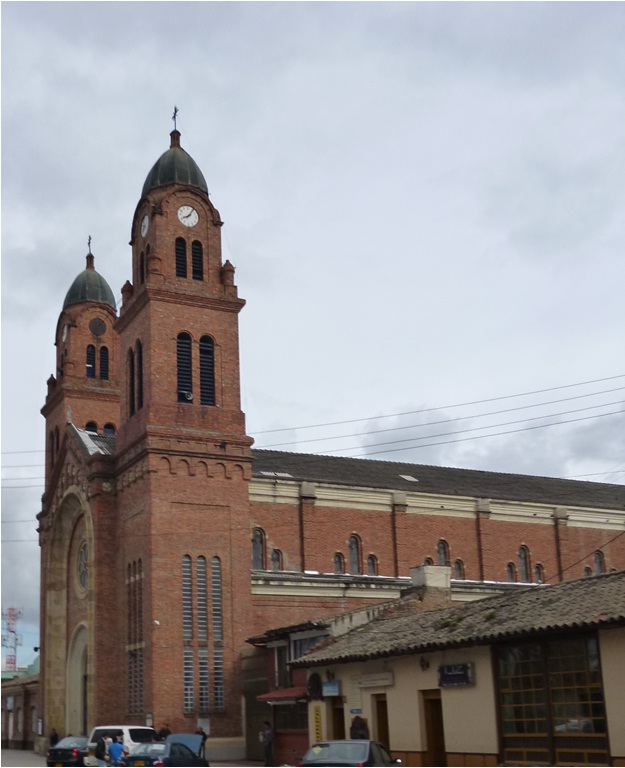
Church of Mosquera

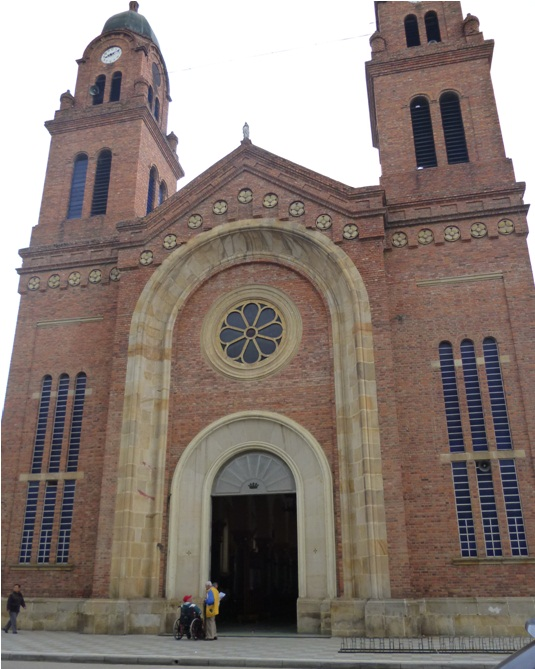
Church

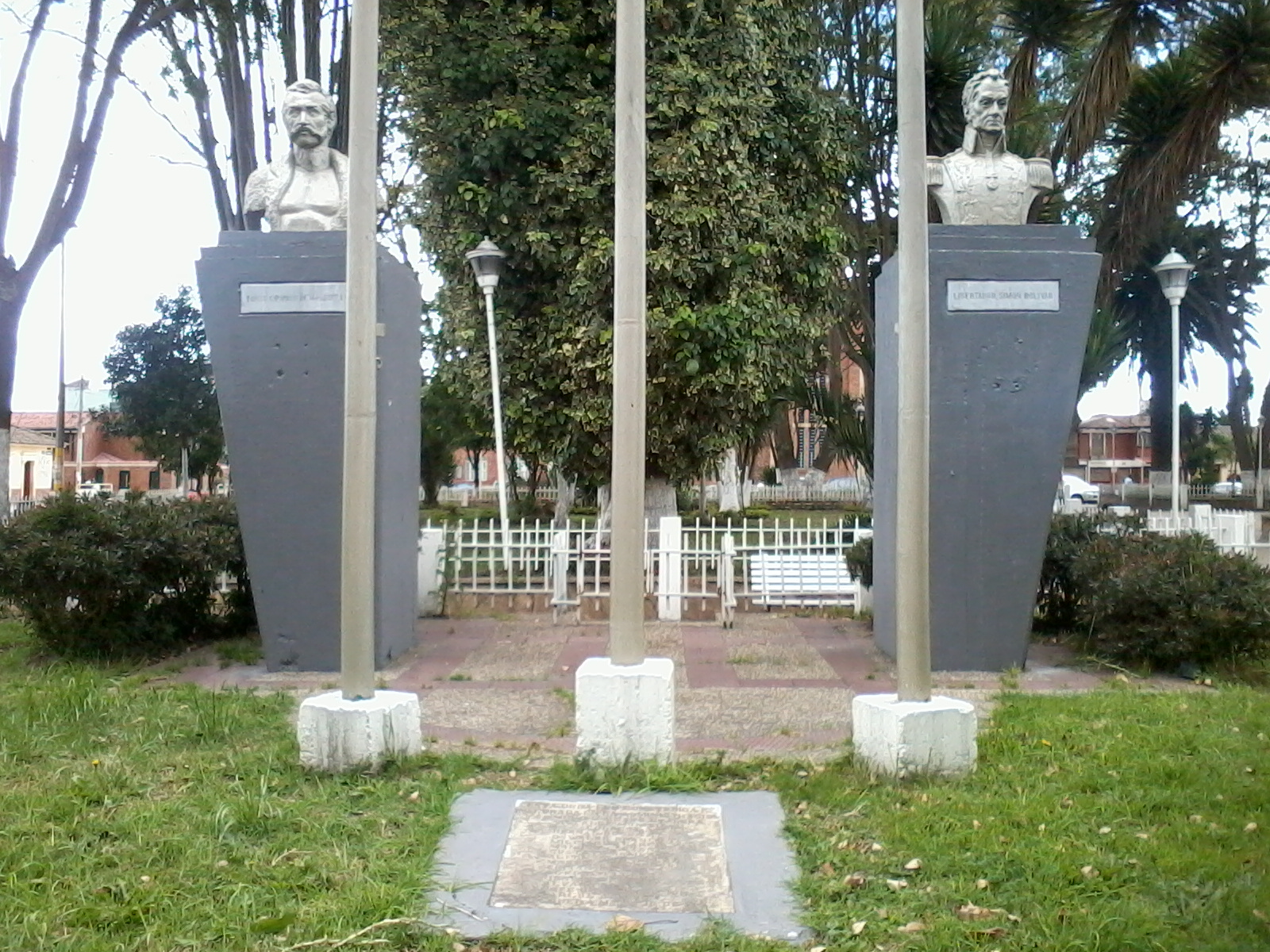
Bustes of Tomás Cipriano de Mosquera and Simón Bolívar

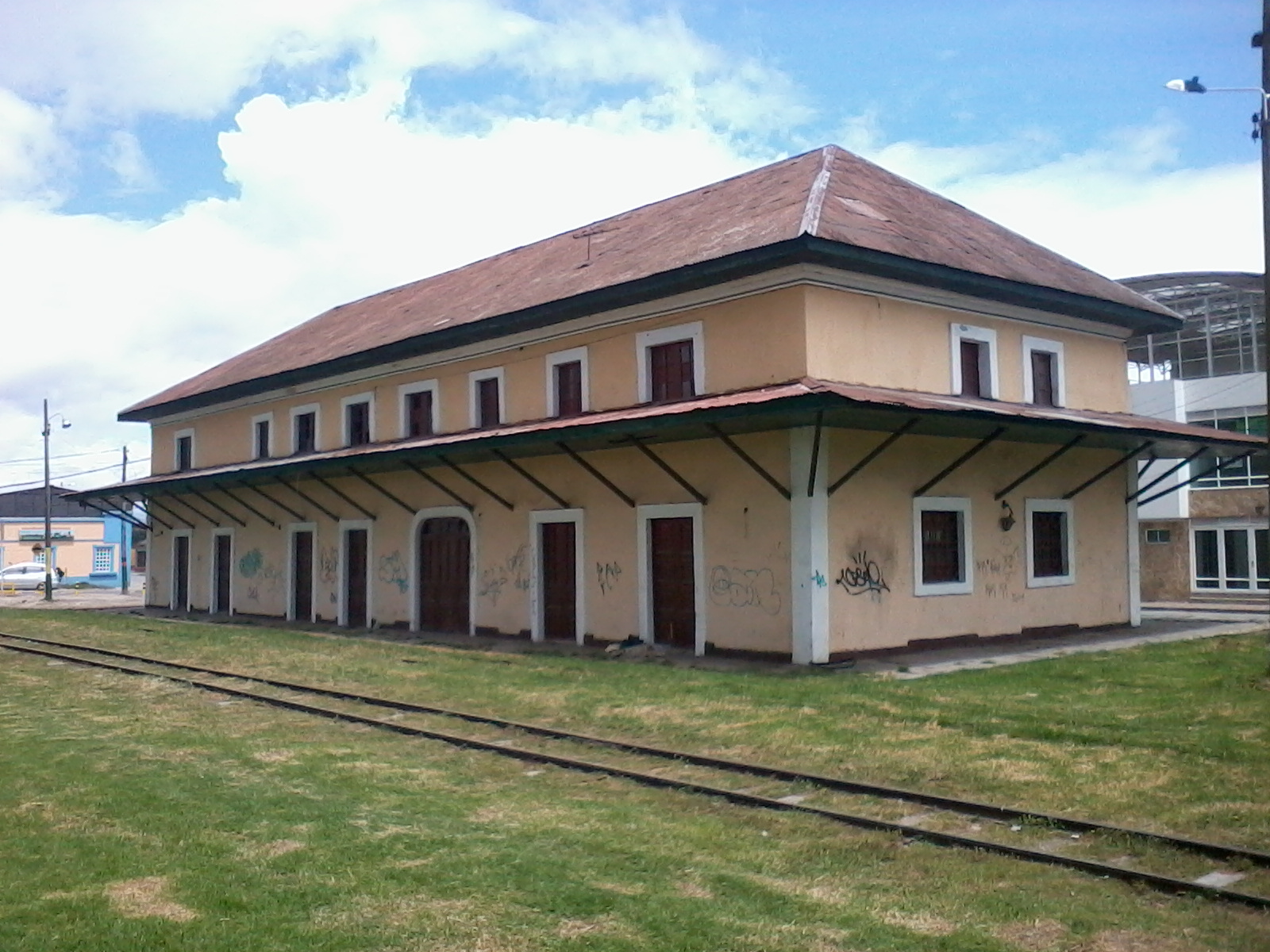
Train station

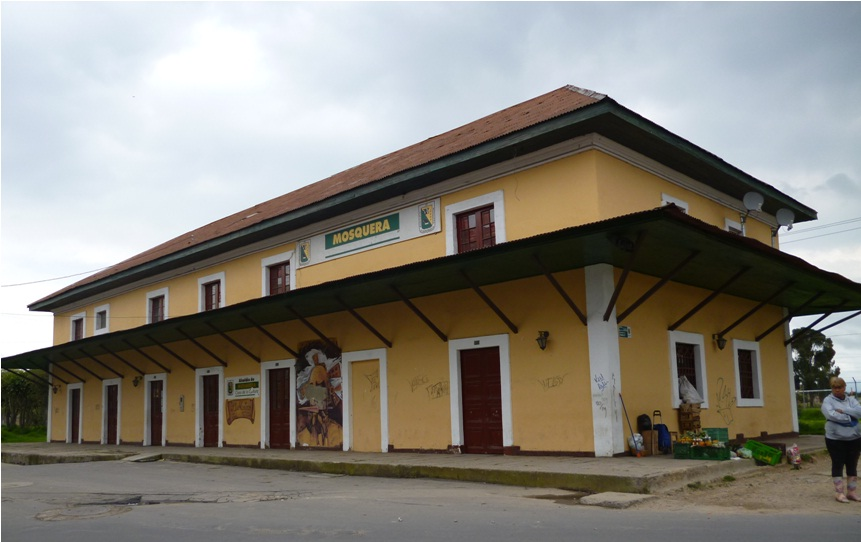
Cultural centre
