= Madrid (Colombia) =

- Municipality
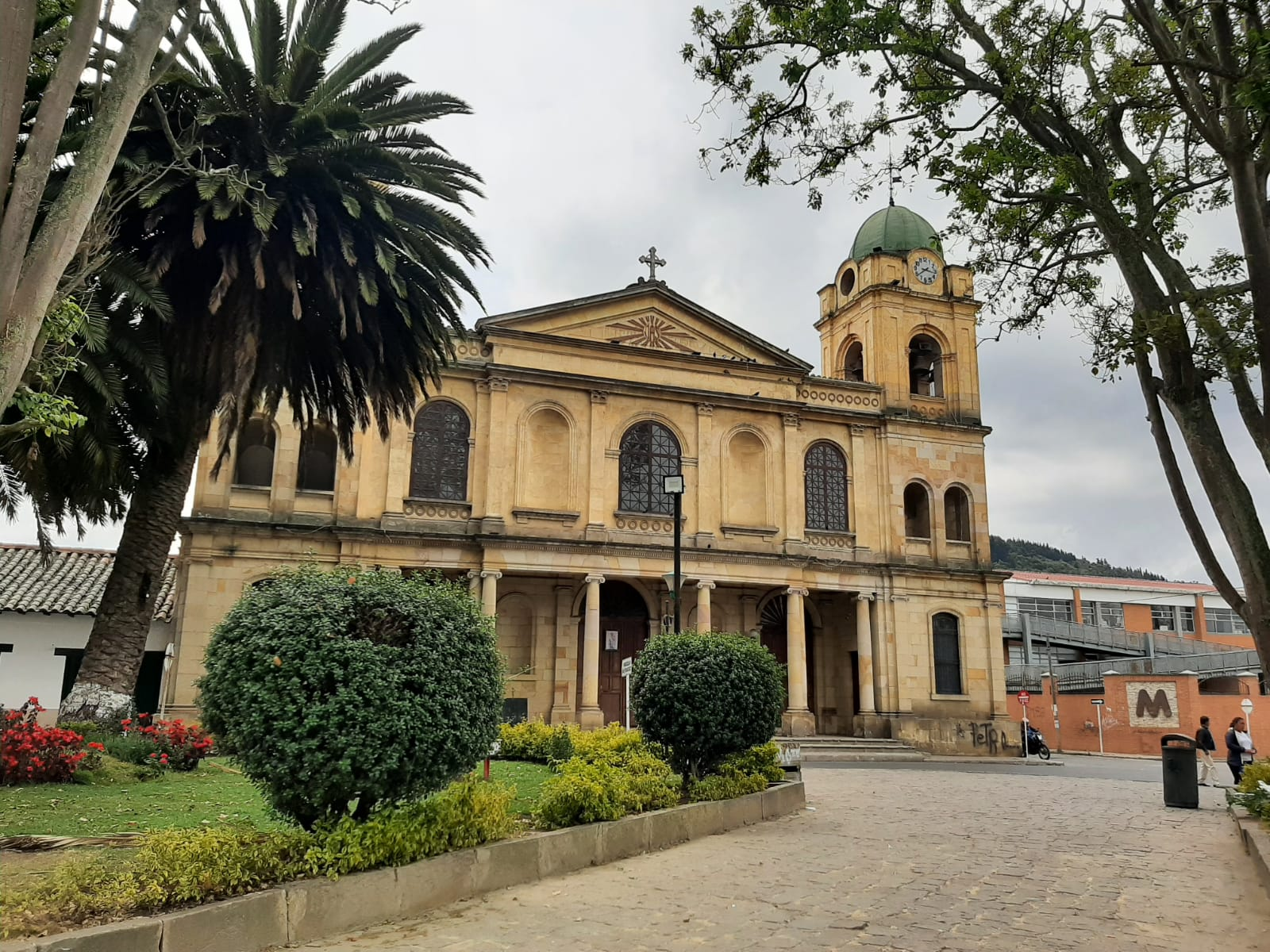
- San Francisco de Paula Church

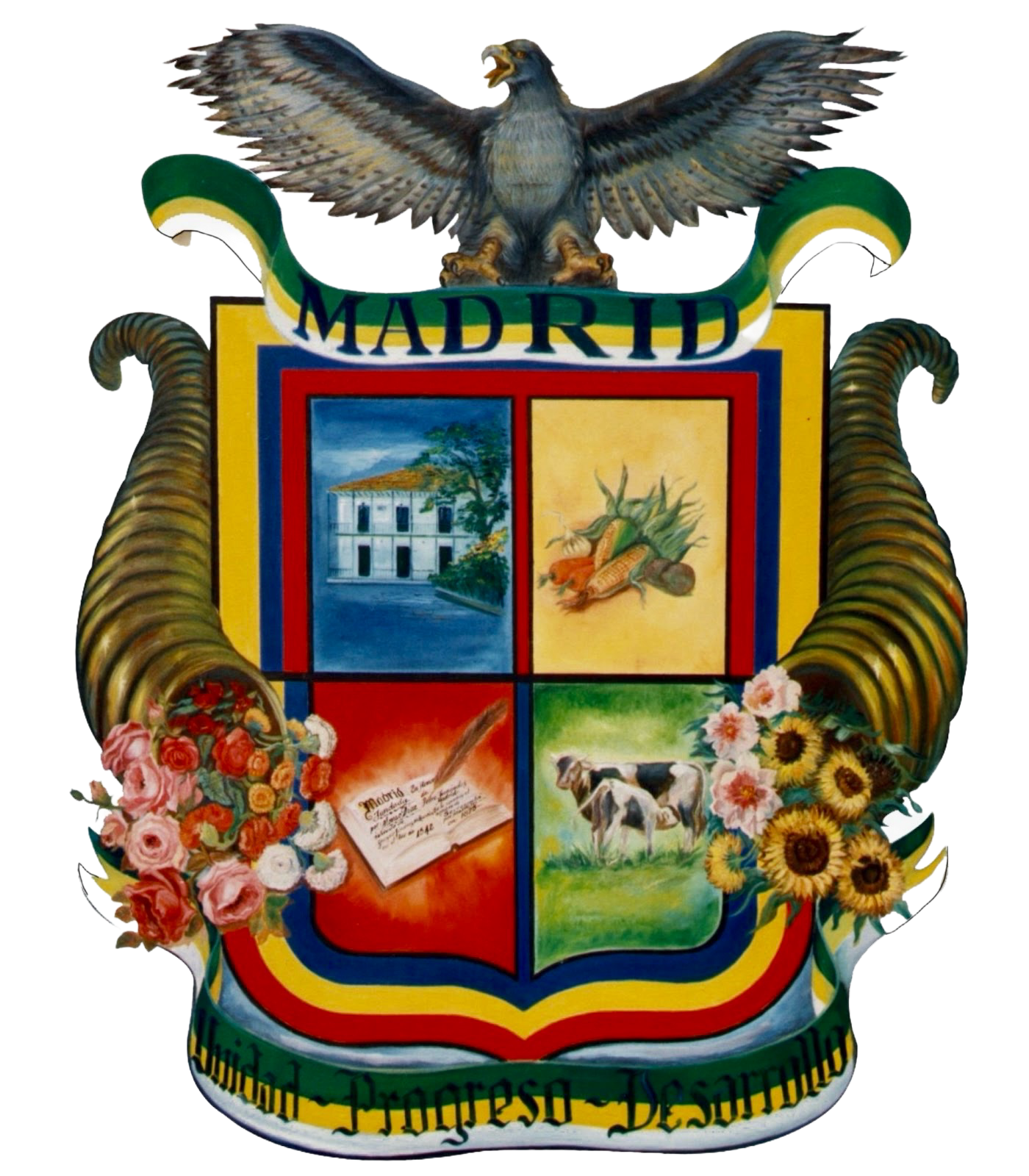
- Flag Coat of arms
- Motto: Unity - Progress - Development
- Anthem: Anthem of Madrid, Cundinamarca
- Location of the municipality and town of Madrid in the Cundinamarca Department of Colombia

- Location in Colombia
- Coordinates: 4°44′04″N 74°16′06″W
- Country: Colombia
- Department: Cundinamarca
- Province: Western Savanna Province
- Founded: November 20, 1559
- As a municipal district: 1834
- Founder: Alonso Díaz
- Named for: Pedro Fernández Madrid

Government
  - Mayor: Carlos Alberto Chávez Moya (2024-2027)

Area
  - Municipality: 120.5 km^{2} (46.5 sq mi)
  - Urban: 7.5 km^{2} (2.9 sq mi)
  - Rural: 113 km^{2} (44 sq mi)
- Elevation: 2,554 m (8,379 ft)

Population (2024)
  - Municipality: 140,000
  - Density: 1,200/km^{2} (3,000/sq mi)
  - Urban: 135,000
  - Urban density: 18,000/km^{2} (47,000/sq mi)
- Demonym(s): Madrilenian, madrileño, -ña
- Time zone: UTC-5
- Postal code: 250030
- Area code: 60+1
- Website: www.madrid-cundinamarca.gov.co/

Madrid (Spanish pronunciation: [maˈðɾið]) is a municipality located in the Cundinamarca Department, Colombia, within the Western Savanna Province. As of 2024, it has an estimated population of approximately 140,000 residents, making it one of the most populous municipalities in the region and the country. The municipality spans an area of 120.5 square kilometers and is situated at an altitude of 2,554 meters above sea level. The city is located 21 kilometers west of Bogotá, and is closely connected to the Colombian capital as part of its broader metropolitan area. Established as an encomienda in 1559 by Alonso Díaz and originally named Serrezuela, the municipality was renamed Madrid in 1875. Currently, it is a popular commuter town.

== History ==
Before the arrival of European colonizers and the rise of the Muisca culture, the area now known as the municipality of Madrid was inhabited by the Herrera Culture, one of the earliest sedentary societies on the Bogotá savanna. This community established settlements near water sources such as the Subachoque River and Lake La Herrera.

In the later pre-Columbian era, the region became known as Tibaitatá, which was a significant agricultural center within the Muisca Confederation in the zipazgo, the domain ruled by the zipa. The zipazgo was governed by Chief Sugasuca and administered from Bacatá (present-day Funza).

Simón Bolívar, known as the Liberator, and Antonio Nariño, key precursors of the independence movement, both spent time in and contributed to Madrid.

The municipality of Madrid is characterized by two notable mountainous formations of significant geographical and ecological importance. To the southeast is Cerro Tibaitatá, located near the historic Hacienda Casablanca, with elevations ranging from 2,550 to 2,750 meters above sea level (MSL). This formation stands as a prominent geographical and historical landmark in the region. To the north lies the rural area of Valle del Abra, a designated natural reserve known for its ecological value. This area encompasses diverse landscapes and supports rich biodiversity, serving as a habitat for numerous bird species, insects, and native plant varieties. In recent years, the region has seen the development of ecotourism initiatives, including the construction of lodges and hotels to accommodate visitors. Cerro Tibaitatá and Valle del Abra have emerged as popular destinations for outdoor recreational activities, such as hiking and mountain biking. These efforts have contributed to the promotion of sustainable tourism while supporting environmental conservation and fostering greater appreciation for the area's natural and cultural heritage.

Madrid serves as the location of the country's oldest air base, Comando Aéreo de Mantenimiento (Air Maintenance Command), and the Escuela de Suboficiales of the Colombian Air Force (Air Force Non-Commissioned Officers School).

== Toponymy ==
The name Madrid, conferred in honor of Pedro Fernández Madrid, was established to commemorate this notable figure, who was born in Havana, Cuba, and spent his final years in the municipality formerly known as Serrezuela. Following his death on February 7, 1875, the local community petitioned the Departmental Assembly of Cundinamarca to rename the municipality in his honor. This request was approved through Law 14 on November 17, 1875, thereby embedding Fernández Madrid's legacy within the region's toponymy.

The name Serrezuela was reinstated in 1945 but was replaced by Madrid again in 1946. However, in 1973, the Departmental Assembly restored the original name in accordance with Law 5 of 1920, which requires towns to adopt indigenous, ancient, or historical names. The current name, Madrid, was officially established by Decree No. 14 on November 16, 1976. Historian Roberto Velandia explains that the adoption of the name Madrid occurred somewhat incidentally, influenced by the political and social resonance associated with the figure it commemorates.

The toponym Madrid traces its earliest recorded usage to the Andalusian period, where it appeared as Maǧrīţ. Over time, this evolved into Magerit in Old Spanish. The etymology of the name has been a subject of considerable scholarly debate. The most widely accepted hypothesis, advanced by Arabist Jaime Oliver Asín, suggests that the name derives from the Andalusi Romance term Matrice, meaning mother stream or matrix.

For an extended period, the dual toponyms Maǧrīţ and Magerit coexisted, used respectively by the Muslim and Christian communities residing on the hills of Almudena and Vistillas in Madrid, Spain. These communities were separated by an ancient stream, now corresponding to Segovia Street. The collaborative presence of these groups played a pivotal role in the origin and perpetuation of these names. This etymological and historical context has been further explored and refined through the comprehensive studies of Joan Coromines and Federico Corriente Córdoba, whose meticulous analyses have significantly deepened the understanding of the name Madrid.

The municipality of Madrid in Cundinamarca presents an intriguing etymological coincidence, linking its name to that of Madrid, the capital of Spain. The name of the Spanish Madrid originates from the ancient Arroyo de San Pedro, a stream that once flowed through Segovia Street, and its etymology traces back to Andalusian and Mozarabic linguistic roots. In contrast, the Andean Madrid derives its name in honor of Pedro Fernández Madrid. Notably, this Colombian municipality is situated along the Subachoque River, introducing an additional layer of geographical and cultural significance to its toponymy.

This similarity suggests a geographic and cultural parallel between the Spanish stream and the Cundinamarcan river, while also enriching the study of naming conventions through hydronymic influences in the Spanish context and oronymic influences in the Colombian case. The latter is particularly significant given that the colonial name of the Colombian municipality was Serrezuela, a term referring to a small mountain range, specifically the Tibaytatá hill.

The demonym for the inhabitants of the municipality is madrileño and madrileña (madrilenian in english).

== Location ==
Madrid, located in the department of Cundinamarca, forms part of the western subregion of the Bogotá Savanna and lies within the first metropolitan ring of the capital, situated just 21 kilometers away. Positioned to the east of the Western Savanna Province and southwest of the Bogotá Savanna, Madrid is surrounded by the densely populated municipalities of Facatativá, Funza, and Mosquera.

The urban area is bordered by the Subachoque and Bojacá rivers, which function as both natural and administrative boundaries. The location is along the Bogotá Highway and the railway line connecting the capital to Puerto Salgar.

The municipality is divided into two distinct geographical zones. Approximately 84% of the territory consists of flatlands, which are well-suited for agricultural and livestock activities due to their efficient drainage and abundant water resources. The remaining 16% is mountainous, with elevations reaching up to 2,875 meters above sea level (m a.s.l.) south of the urban center, exceeding the Bogotá Savanna's average altitude of 2,600 m a.s.l.

Madrid is strategically positioned along two major national transportation corridors that intersect in the capital. The north-south axis connects Tunja, Girardot, and Ibagué, while the east-west axis links Villavicencio, Honda, and the Colombian Coffee Growing Axis. These corridors concentrate a significant portion of Cundinamarca's transportation infrastructure and public services.

Located on the western axis of the metropolitan polygon, Madrid forms part of the Metropolitan Area of Bogotá, which includes municipalities such as Soacha, Chía, Funza, and Mosquera.

== Climate ==
The municipality features a temperate isothermal climate categorized as Csb, as per the Köppen climate classification. Owing to its elevation, Madrid experiences a mountainous climate, and due to its low latitude, it exhibits minimal thermal variation throughout the course of the year. Temperatures typically range between 7 °C to 20 °C, with an average temperature of 14 °C.

Climate data for Madrid (Base Aerea Madrid), elevation 2,550 m (8,370 ft), (1981–2010)
Month	Jan	Feb	Mar	Apr	May	Jun	Jul	Aug	Sep	Oct	Nov	Dec	Year
Mean daily maximum °C (°F)	18.9 (66.0)	19.3 (66.7)	18.7 (65.7)	18.7 (65.7)	18.6 (65.5)	18.4 (65.1)	18.4 (65.1)	18.4 (65.1)	18.6 (65.5)	18.2 (64.8)	18.4 (65.1)	18.7 (65.7)	18.6 (65.5)
Daily mean °C (°F)	13.5 (56.3)	13.6 (56.5)	13.8 (56.8)	14.0 (57.2)	14.1 (57.4)	13.9 (57.0)	13.8 (56.8)	13.8 (56.8)	13.8 (56.8)	13.8 (56.8)	13.8 (56.8)	13.6 (56.5)	13.8 (56.8)
Mean daily minimum °C (°F)	5.3 (41.5)	5.4 (41.7)	6.7 (44.1)	7.7 (45.9)	7.7 (45.9)	7.0 (44.6)	6.4 (43.5)	6.4 (43.5)	6.1 (43.0)	6.8 (44.2)	7.0 (44.6)	5.3 (41.5)	6.5 (43.7)
Average precipitation mm (inches)	14.1 (0.56)	29.3 (1.15)	41.8 (1.65)	73.9 (2.91)	72.2 (2.84)	49.7 (1.96)	38.8 (1.53)	36.3 (1.43)	42.7 (1.68)	74.2 (2.92)	64.5 (2.54)	30.0 (1.18)	567.5 (22.34)
Average precipitation days	6	9	12	15	17	14	13	12	12	16	14	8	136
Average relative humidity (%)	79	80	81	82	82	81	80	79	80	82	82	81	81
Mean monthly sunshine hours	189.1	158.1	139.5	111.0	111.6	120.0	136.4	139.5	132.0	130.2	126.0	167.4	1,660.8
Mean daily sunshine hours	6.1	5.6	4.5	3.7	3.6	4.0	4.4	4.5	4.4	4.2	4.2	5.4	4.6
Source: Instituto de Hidrologia Meteorologia y Estudios Ambientales
