= Facatativá =

- Municipality and city
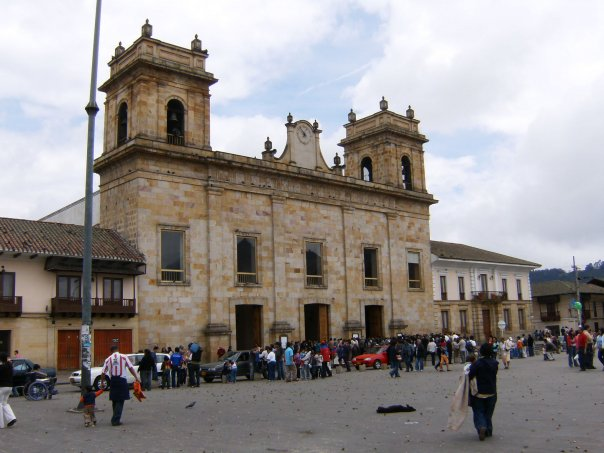
- Cathedral of Facatativá

- Flag Coat of arms
- Motto(s): Present and future of Cundinamarca (Presente y futuro de Cundinamarca)
- Geolocation of Facatativá in Cundinamarca

- Location in Colombia
- Coordinates: 4°49′N 74°22′W
- Country: Colombia
- Department: Cundinamarca
- Province: Western Savanna Province
- Founded: July 3, 1600
- Founder: Diego Gómez de Mena

Government
  - Mayor: Luis Carlos Casas (2024-2027)

Area
  - Municipality and city: 158 km^{2} (61 sq mi)
  - Urban: 7.65 km^{2} (2.95 sq mi)
- Elevation: 2,586 m (8,484 ft)

Population (2020 est.)
  - Municipality and city: 155,978
  - Density: 987/km^{2} (2,560/sq mi)
  - Urban: 145,080
  - Urban density: 19,000/km^{2} (49,100/sq mi)
- Time zone: UTC-5 (Colombia Standard Time)
- Area code: +1
- Website: Official website

Veredas of Facatativá: 1.La Tribuna 2.La Selva 3.San Rafael 4.Mancilla 5.Cuatro Esquinas 6.Tierra Morada 7.Tierra Grata 8.Paso Ancho 9.Moyano 10.Prado 11.Los Manzanos 12.Pueblo Viejo 13.Zona Urbana 14.Corito 15.El Corzo

Facatativá is a city and municipality in the Cundinamarca Department, located about 18 miles (31 km) northwest of Bogotá, Colombia and 2,586 meters above sea level. The city is known for its Archaeological Park Piedras del Tunjo (Rocks of the Tunjo Indian) and best known in Colombia as Piedras del Tunjo (literally, Rocks of Tunjo), although locals call it Piedras de Tunja (Rocks of Tunja). It features large rock formations that were once the bottom of a lake.

== Etymology ==
The word Facatativá comes from the indigenous Chibcha language spoken by the Muisca who inhabited the area of Facatativá before the Spanish conquest. It has been translated and interpreted differently over time. The historically accepted translation is "fenced fort at the end of the plains" (Cercado fuerte al final de la llanura) although it has also been translated as "fenced fort outside the farming soil" (Cercado fuerte a las afueras de la labranza) This refers to the town being at the edge of the Bogotá savanna.

== History ==
Facatativá traces its history to indigenous cultures of the Andes similar to the ones found in the rest of Latin America. Although there is not an accurate record of the time human activity first took place in that area. Excavations have shown nevertheless that the highlands of Colombia might have been inhabited since the Holocene era.

Different records of historic human activity have been found in Facatativá. Evidence of inhabitants of the Herrera Period and Muisca pottery and indigenous paintings and sculptures are samples of their religious beliefs and social structure. The Piedras del Tunjo Archaeological Park for example features prehistoric paintings, many of them now vandalized.

Facatativá was discovered by the Spanish conquistadors led by Gonzalo Jiménez de Quesada, while on the quest for El Dorado. Jiménez de Quesada had his first contact with what is today's Facatativá while trying to capture indigenous Muisca zipa Tisquesusa who intended to escape the Spanish invasion with six hundred men. Tisquesusa was captured and killed by Spanish soldiers on July 15, 1537.

Facatativá was officially founded in 1600 by Spanish administrator Diego Gómez de Mena. Traditionally in the Spanish style of city development during the colonization of Spanish America the city's most important building was its church which was ordered to be built by Gómez de Mena in 1601.

=== Cathedral of Facatativá ===
Facatativá's most important building is its cathedral, contiguous to the Simon Bolivar Plaza in downtown Facatativá.

Although originally an ordinary Catholic church a series of earthquakes damaged the buildings, forcing every new construction into a better one. The first one was founded in 1601 and lasted until July 12, 1785 when it was damaged by an earthquake. Priest Juan de la Mata Salazar y Caicedo noticed the building's failure and a new church was built in May 1787. This new church would become an Augustinian temple.

On November 17, 1827 a new earthquake damaged the structure. However it was able to stand until 1870 when a new temple was inaugurated. The newly built church was finally opened on August 6, 1895. By the time head priest Agustino Pedro Salazar also created the Priest Home.

Seventy two years later a new earthquake damaged the church on February 9. The administration of Bishop Monsignor Raul Zambrano Camader quickly ordered the rebuilding of a newer and lasting cathedral to the architectures of Vargas Triana & COPRE. This cathedral stands until today and is the people's favorite place of worship and an attractive touristic place.

=== Historic Milestones ===
A big part of the history of Facatativá has been kept in parish books recorded and signed by priests whom in many cases also participated as city administrators. The oldest one of those books dates from 1692. This documents were chronologically signed by the priests in charge. Some of this documents are missing in the historical records of the city. This documents held important historic data.

==== 18th century ====
On May 21, 1781, Facatativá Captain José Antonio Galán and Lieutenant Nicolas Jose de Vesga arrived with a company of a hundred comuneros. These personnel were given to Galan by Juan Francisco Berbeo at the municipality of Nemocón so he could capture the Spanish Regent Gutierrez de Pineres.

==== 19th century ====
By mid 19th century, the road from Los Manzanos to Bogotá was built; this is of historical importance since Facatativá was a venue for a number of confrontations and historic wars of independence.

By Decree of March 9, 1848, from President Tomas Cipriano de Mosquera, Facatativá was chosen as the capital of Canton of Funza due to its convenient geographic location.

In the year 1851, the first notary office was established and on February 28, 1859, the first office of registry of the circuit of Facatativá.

In January 1856, Governor Pedro Luis Gutierrez Lee introduced a bill for the acknowledgement of the Parish of Facatativá by the legislation of the Independent State of Cundinamarca (now known as the Cundinamarca Department).

On January 17, 1865, the State Assembly announced in Facatativá the fifth Constitution of Cundinamarca. That same year the telegraph was put into service. On December 14, 1869, the national Colombian government made a contract with William Lee Stiles for the telegraph line between the cities Facatativá-Villeta-Guaduas-Honda which would connect with the ones in Ambalema and Manizales. They were built by the same engineer according to the contract of August 30, 1866. On August 2, 1870, Salvador Camacho made a contract with Victoriano Paredes for the construction of a telegraph line between Facatativá and Honda.

The City Hall was built in 1882 under the administration of Governor Daniel Aldana whom on February 28 of the same year would sign a deal for the construction of the Savanah railroad (Ferrocarril de la Sabana). On July 26, 1886 his successor General Jaime Cordoba made a contract so the railroad was finally built.

On January 5, 1884, the first stone of a new hospital was set on the corner of a piece of land that was first intended of use as a slaughterhouse.

==== 20th century ====
On March 8, 1907, the district prison was built.

On February 13, 1909, arrived the first locomotive from Girardot. It was necessary to build a new station since the width of the tracks of the already existent Savanna Line was different. In 1926 the tracks were conveniently matched.

On July 20, 1911, an obelisk was inaugurated at the "Plaza of the Republic" known today as Santander Park as a way to honor the independence heroes killed there on August 31, 1816. By the time Facatativá had become a gate for to the New Kingdom of Granada and it was also a place for the trading of produce from warmer and colder climates.

In the year 1933, the first Produce Market Plaza was open being this one among the first ones in the country.

On May 6, 1940, a 100th anniversary of the death of General Francisco de Paula Santander was commemorated with a bust on the Santander Plaza.

On December 18, 1972, died Monsignor Raul Zambrano Camader first Bishop of the Archdioceses of Facatativá in an aircraft accident occurred at the El Tablazo hill.

In conformity to the Constitution of the Province of Cundinamarca of 1815, Facatativá was included in the Canton of Bogotá. By the law 46 of April 29, 1905 Cundinamarca was divided in two Departments named Quesada and Cundinamarca. Facatativá was installed as the capital city of the Cundinamarca department by national decree431 of May 10 of 1905. The Governor of that time was Belisario Ayala. This would be consequently changed as there were modifications to neighboring departments.

The House of Culture was created on October 12, 1966, by intellectuals, writers and important personalities. In 1973 a building was built as a headquarters for offices and theater. A new and modern building was constructed in 1999 as a new place for operations for the cultural section of the municipal government. This building includes a gallery for visual artists. Courses and schooling is provided here.

In 1996, a series of riots broke out. These riots lasted at least a week and were triggered by protests against a bill that would classify families based on the aspect of the facade of their homes and on their location disregarding the actual income of their dwellers, therefore affecting their taxes. Many business were subject of looting and resulted in injuries and fatalities. The bill was revised and conveniently modified.

== Economy ==
Facatativá's main source of income is agriculture. Because of its altitude (2586 m) above sea level, Facatativá is a convenient place for growing flowers. The Floral industry is in fact the most important industry in Facatativá providing employment to a big part of the population. Seasonal jobs in the flowers farming increases during the days closer to Saint Valentine's Day in the United States which is the industry's main customer.

Facatativá also is home of several facilities of well-known companies, among them: the dairy products company Alpina, Venezuelan multinational Polar, Peruvian-owned cosmetics and jewelry company Yanbal, Colombian Oil company Ecopetrol, Rice of the Savannah, United Soap, Inagro among others.

The population of Facatativá have the convenience of having several department stores, such as Colombian owned Exito and Chilean Jumbo.

== Demographics ==
The people are mainly a mixture of Spanish and Amerindian, having the mestizo race as the most common people, with at least a 15% of unmixed whites.

== Telecommunications ==
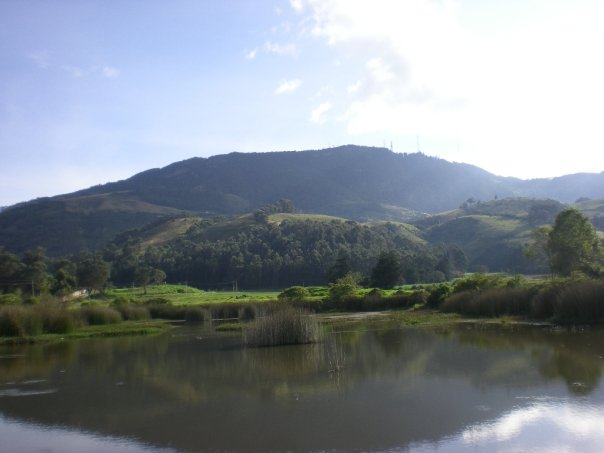
Manjui Hill (Cerro de Manjui)

Telecommunications in Facatativá have been for a long time administered in a monopolistic way by the Colombian Telecommunications company Telecom. With the raise of the demand of telecommunication services and the entering of new providers to the Colombian market, Facatativá has been benefited with the competitive prices offered for broadband internet and telephony. However, compared to industrialized countries, broadband internet continues more as an expensive luxury than as a necessary tool for the middle lower class population. The taxes imposed to the imported appliances such as computers continue to make the access to technology very difficult since a person in Colombia would have to pay more for a computer. Telecom has partnered with Mexican company Telmex to provide internet access. There is also competition with the Telephones Company of Bogota (ETB) which was formerly restricted from offering telecommunication services outside Bogota.

Access to terrestrial telephone lines is fairly simple for most people in Facatativá and the widespread of cellular telephony in Colombia has allowed people to easily remain connected to their loved ones.

For people without access to internet at their homes there are a number of internet cafes and internet booths. Most schools are in the process of either getting or improving their access to technology. However, most of them still lack the economic support to sponsor enough hardware so students can have continuing access to the World Wide Web.

Facatativá has two important centers of wireless, radio and microwave communications with equipment 99% digital. Colombia's biggest repeater antenna is located at the top of the Manjui Hill and is a heavily guarded facility because of its importance to the country's communications.

== Military ==
Communications battalion, police and anti-narcotics squads. Cavalry school and major police headquarters for the protection of the Colombian petroleum research facilities located there.

== Climate ==
Climate data for Facatativá/Bojacá (Acapulco), elevation 2,650 m (8,690 ft), (1981–2010)
Month	Jan	Feb	Mar	Apr	May	Jun	Jul	Aug	Sep	Oct	Nov	Dec	Year
Mean daily maximum °C (°F)	16.1 (61.0)	16.1 (61.0)	16.0 (60.8)	16.0 (60.8)	16.1 (61.0)	16.1 (61.0)	15.7 (60.3)	15.8 (60.4)	16.3 (61.3)	16.0 (60.8)	16.0 (60.8)	15.9 (60.6)	16.0 (60.8)
Daily mean °C (°F)	13.0 (55.4)	13.2 (55.8)	13.2 (55.8)	13.4 (56.1)	13.4 (56.1)	13.1 (55.6)	12.7 (54.9)	12.9 (55.2)	13.0 (55.4)	13.1 (55.6)	13.1 (55.6)	12.9 (55.2)	13.1 (55.6)
Mean daily minimum °C (°F)	9.5 (49.1)	9.3 (48.7)	9.8 (49.6)	10.1 (50.2)	10.2 (50.4)	9.9 (49.8)	9.3 (48.7)	9.4 (48.9)	9.7 (49.5)	9.7 (49.5)	9.9 (49.8)	9.5 (49.1)	9.7 (49.5)
Average precipitation mm (inches)	43.4 (1.71)	54.8 (2.16)	77.4 (3.05)	111.9 (4.41)	87.8 (3.46)	44.5 (1.75)	38.4 (1.51)	35.1 (1.38)	63.1 (2.48)	105.3 (4.15)	91.3 (3.59)	70.9 (2.79)	778.2 (30.64)
Average precipitation days	7	7	11	13	12	10	10	9	10	13	12	9	115
Average relative humidity (%)	90	90	91	93	92	92	91	91	91	91	92	91	91
Source: Instituto de Hidrologia Meteorologia y Estudios Ambientales

== See also ==
- Piedras del Tunjo Archaeological Park
- RegioTram

== Gallery ==
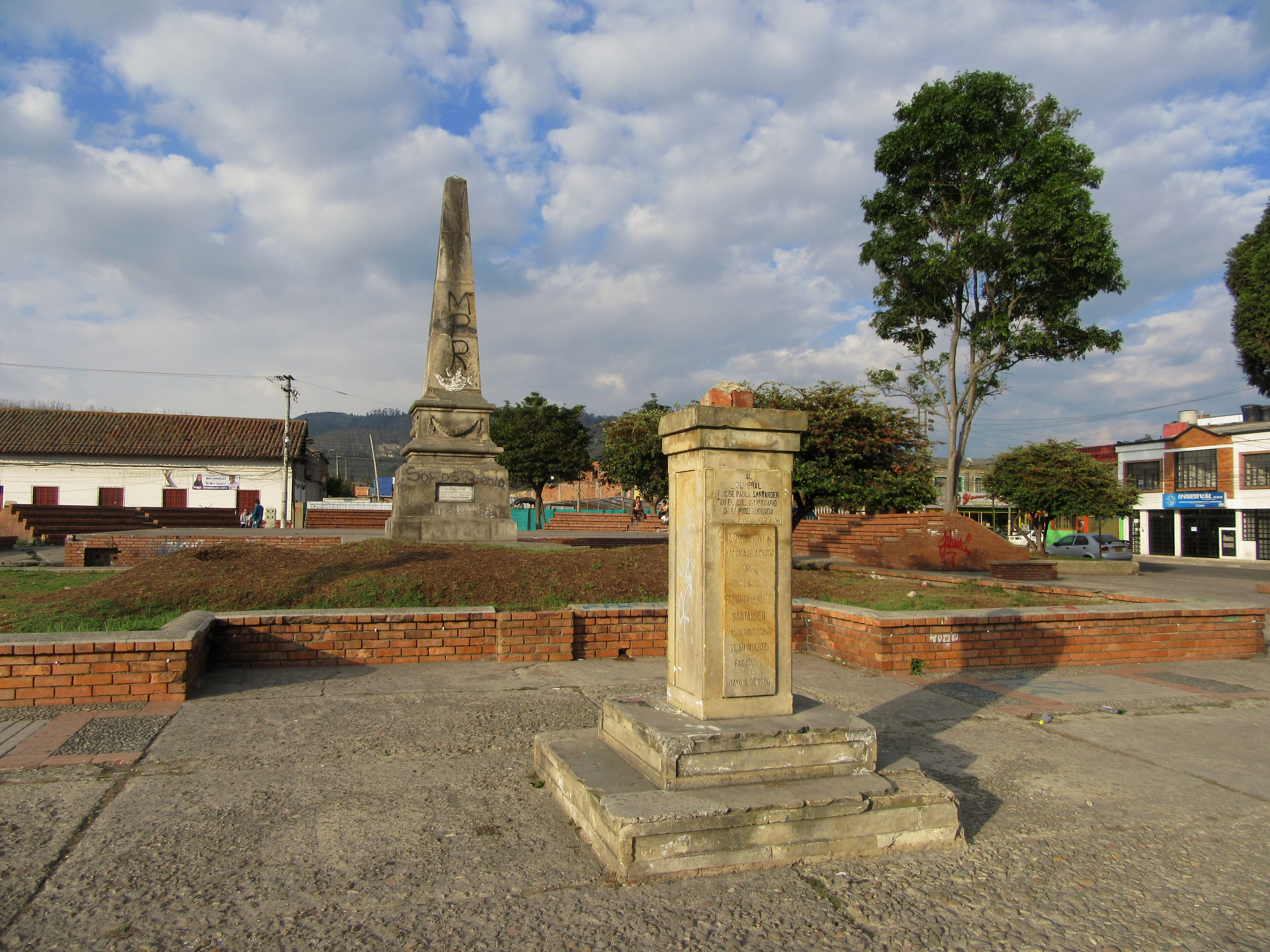
Obelisk in Facatativá

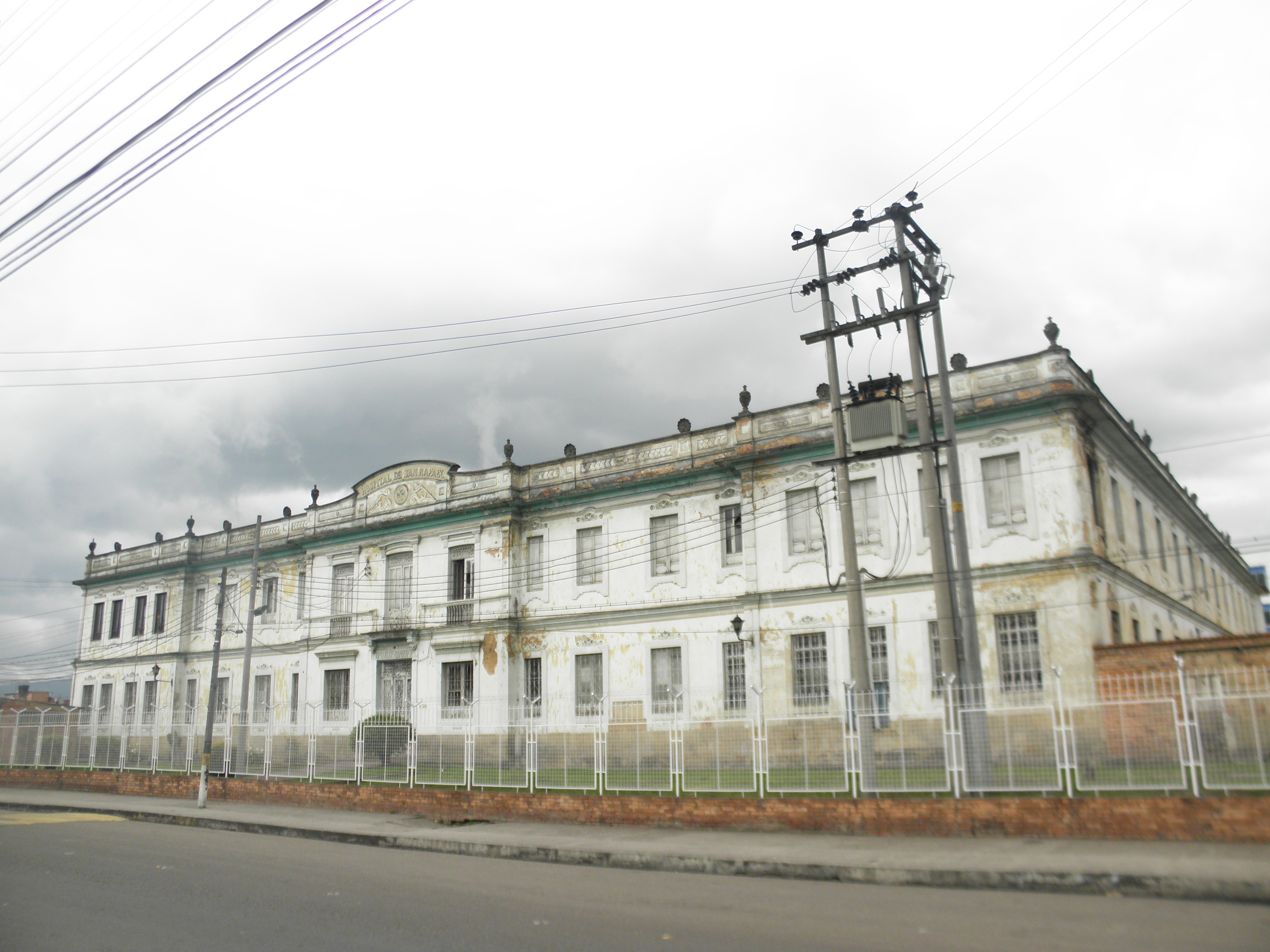
Hospital

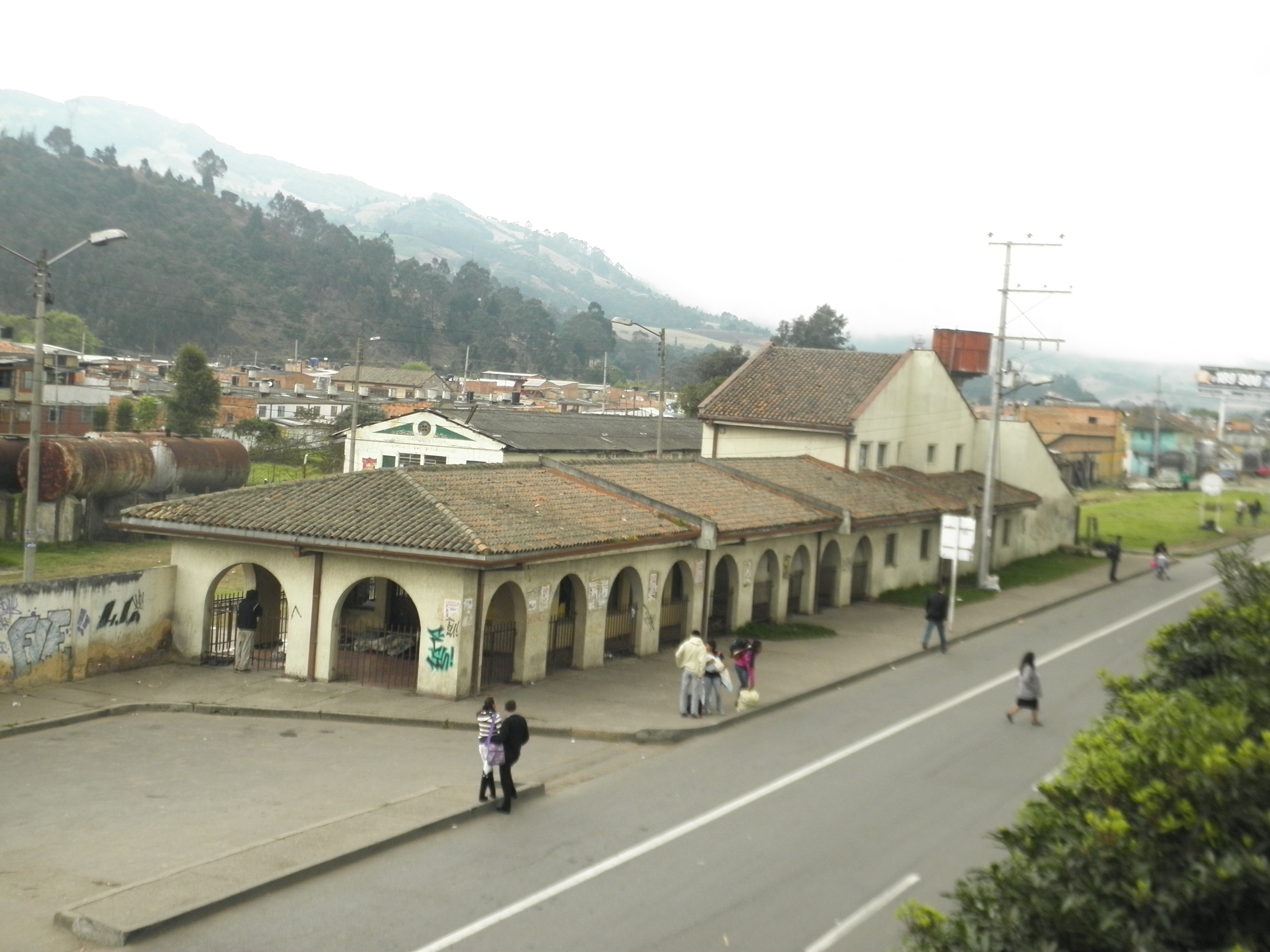
Train station

Cave painting at Piedras del Tunjo Archaeological Park
