= Cundinamarca Department =

Department of Colombia

Cundinamarca Cundinamarca
- Department
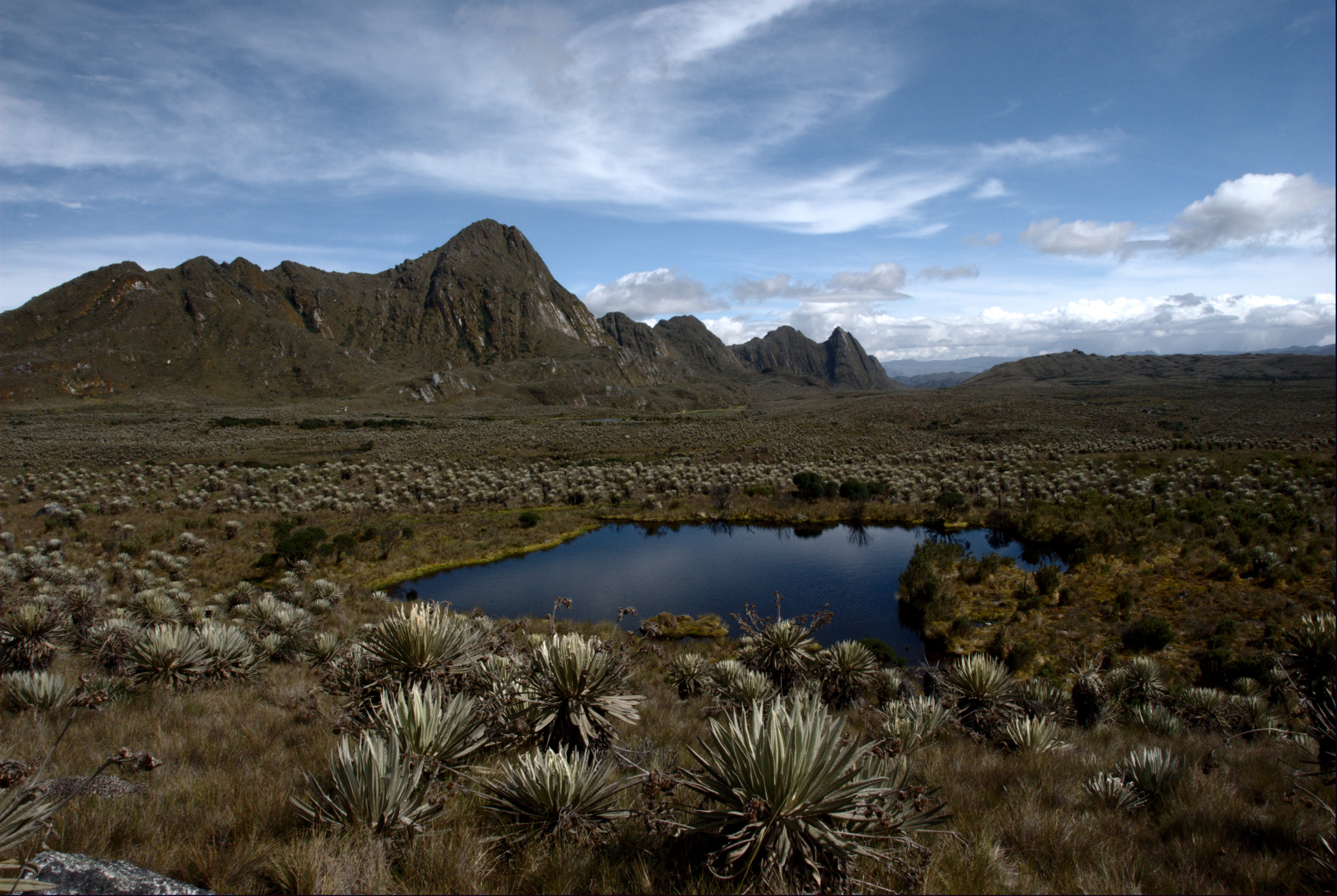
- The Sumapaz Páramo

- Flag Coat of arms
- Motto: Cundinamarca Corazón de Colombia (Spanish: Cundinamarca, Heart of Colombia)
- Anthem: Himno de Cundinamarca
- Cundinamarca is shown in red.

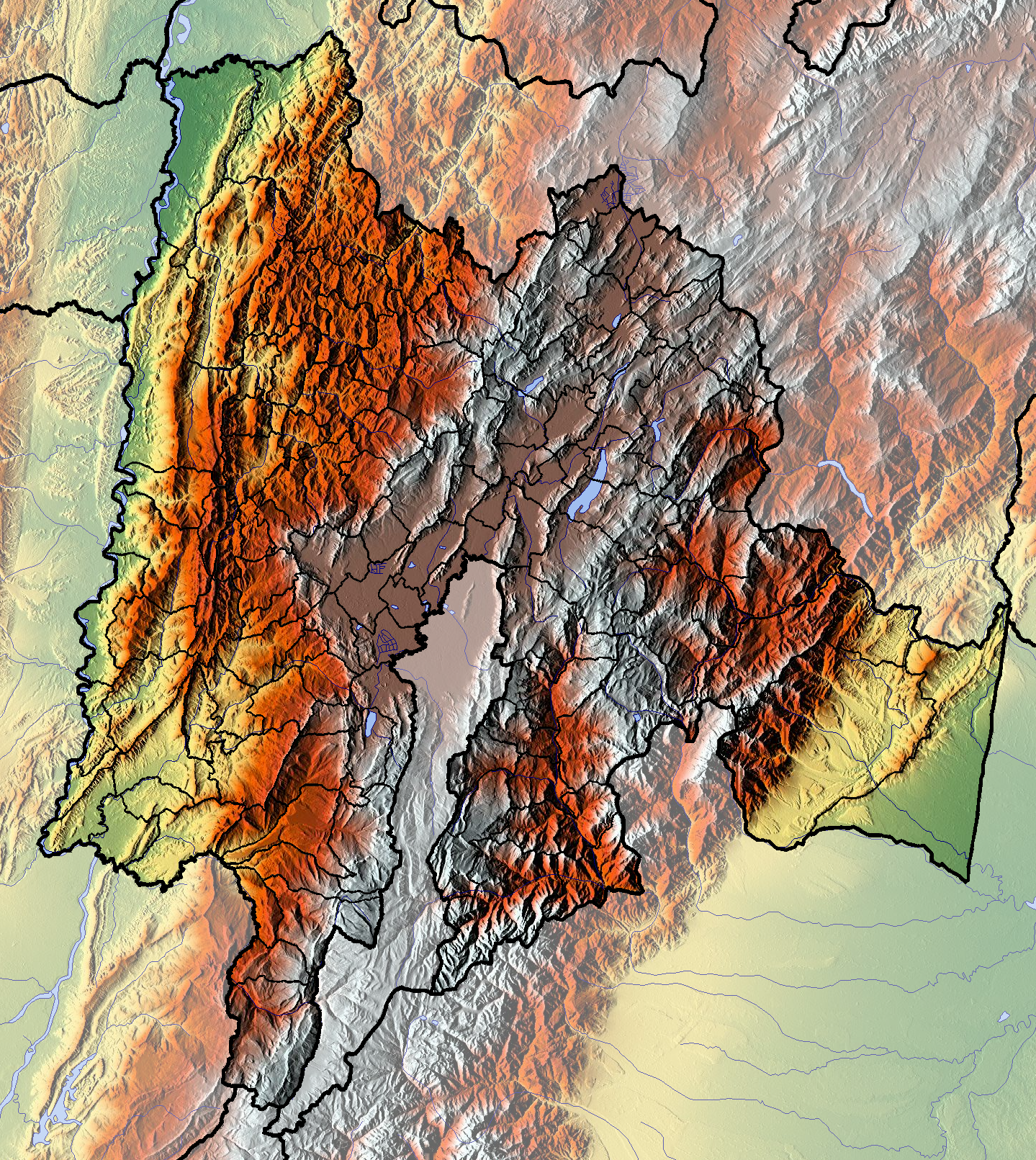
- Topography of the department
- Coordinates: 5°00′N 74°09′W
- Country: Colombia
- Region: Andean Region
- Established: June 15, 1857
- Capital: Bogotá

Government
  - Governor: Jorge Emilio Rey Ángel (2024-2027)

Area
  - Total: 22,623 km^{2} (8,735 sq mi)
  - Rank: 17th
- Elevation: 3,341 m (10,961 ft)

Population (2023 (projection, DANE))
  - Total: 3,445,300
  - Rank: 4th
  - Density: 152.29/km^{2} (394.43/sq mi)

GDP
  - Total: COP 91,946 billion (US$ 21.6 billion)
- Time zone: UTC-05
- ISO 3166 code: CO-CUN
- Provinces: 15
- HDI: 0.794 high · 9th of 33
- Website: Official website

Cundinamarca (Spanish pronunciation: [kundinaˈmaɾka]) is a department of Colombia. Its area covers 22,623 square kilometres (8,735 sq mi) (not including the Capital District) and it has a population of 2,919,060 as of 2018 (3,445,300, DANE 2023 projections). It was created on August 5, 1886, under the constitutional terms presented on the same year. Cundinamarca is located in the center of Colombia.

Cundinamarca's capital city is Bogotá, the capital of Colombia. This is a special case among Colombian departments, since Bogotá is not legally a part of Cundinamarca, yet it is the only department that has its capital designated by the Constitution (if the capital were to be ever moved, it would take a constitutional reform to do so, instead of a simple ordinance passed by the Cundinamarca Assembly). In censuses, the populations for Bogotá and Cundinamarca are tabulated separately; otherwise, Cundinamarca's population would total over 11 million.

== Etymology ==
According to Colombia’s National Cultural Information System (Sistema Nacional de Información Cultural de Colombia, SINIC), the territory that now comprises the department of Cundinamarca was inhabited in pre-Columbian times by various Indigenous societies, most notably the Muisca. This presence has led some historians to associate the origin of the department’s name with terms belonging to this community. However, there is no consensus regarding its exact origin, resulting in various interpretations of its meaning.

One of the most widely circulated theories was proposed by historian Liborio Zerda, who suggests that Cundinamarca, Cundurcunca, Cutirimarca, or Cundurrumarca translates as “land or height where the condor lives.” According to SINIC, several scholars of linguistics agree that Cundinamarca has its roots in a combination of words from the Chibchan language spoken by the Muisca.

On the other hand, the official website of the Government of Cundinamarca proposes that the name may derive from the words Cundi-ramarca and Cuntinamarca, which would have their origins in Aymara, the language spoken by ancient inhabitants of Peru and Bolivia.

A notable aspect of the name Cundinamarca is its longevity, as it has been used to refer to the region since pre-Hispanic times. Despite the variations it has undergone throughout history, it has maintained its connection to Indigenous heritage, reflecting the cultural continuity of the area.

== History ==
=== Prehistoric period ===
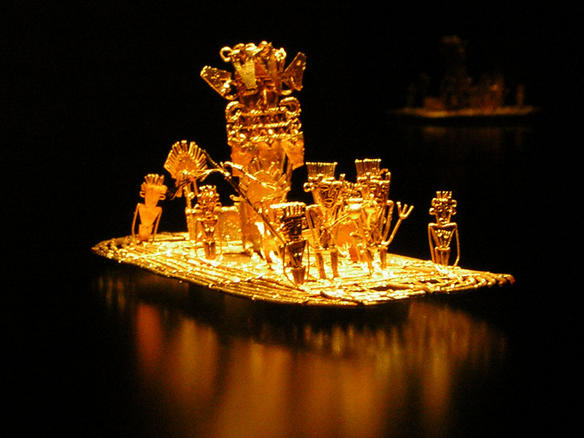
Goldwork representation of the ancient tradition of the Zipa, who, covered in gold, made offerings to the goddess of Lake Guatavita by throwing gold objects into the lake. This tradition is the origin of the legend of El Dorado.

The territory of Cundinamarca was inhabited as early as around 12,000 BC, as demonstrated by fossil records found in El Abra, Zipaquirá, Nemocón, Soacha, and Tequendama. Like Mesoamerica and the Andean region of Peru, it underwent periods of cultural development, progressing from nomadism to the establishment of an advanced culture and passing through the Preclassic, Classic, and Postclassic periods. However, the pre-Muisca civilizations left few traces of their development.

The Muisca, belonging to the Chibchan language family, are believed to have arrived sometime between 1000 BC and AD 1000, during the Classic period. The cultivation of maize, potatoes, tomatoes, and other crops emerged around 1200 BC, when a moderate degree of sedentary settlement developed. Intensive agriculture and industrial processes enabled the development in Cundinamarca of the Muisca civilization, one of the three most advanced pre-Hispanic cultures in the Americas. Probably during the 14th century, peoples of Caribbean origin invaded the Magdalena Valley and the provinces of Sumapaz, Tequendama, Gualivá, and Rionegro. These peoples became known as the Panches, while some smaller tribes of Arawak origin were displaced toward the eastern foothills.

=== Spanish period ===
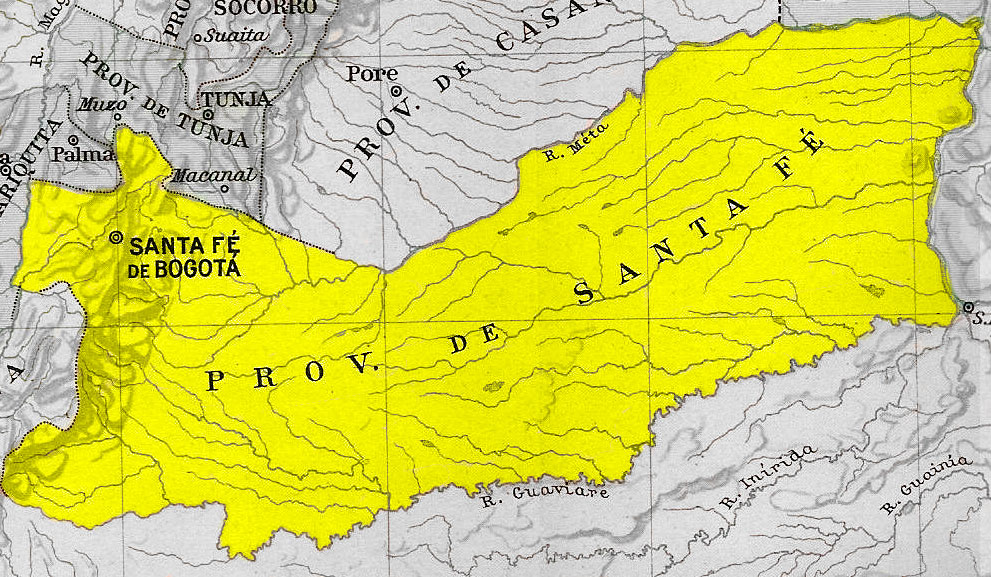
Territory of the Province of Bogotá in 1810, which proclaimed itself the Free and Independent State of Cundinamarca in 1811.

When the Spanish arrived in the region, they found that the Muisca inhabited the high plateau and were governed by the Zipa and a number of lesser caciques. Two major confrontations in Zipaquirá and on the banks of the Bogotá River defeated the Chibcha, and the Zipa Tisquesusa retreated. He was located in Facatativá, where he was killed by the Spanish. An alliance with his successor, Sagipa, enabled the Spanish to defeat and subjugate the Panches at the Battle of Tocarema. Subsequently, through an agreement at Tocaima, the remaining Panche nation was brought under Spanish control. In this way, the entire territory of Cundinamarca came under the authority of the Spanish Crown.

The Bogotá savanna was the site of the meeting of the conquistadors Gonzalo Jiménez de Quesada, Nicolás de Federmán, and Sebastián de Belalcázar in 1538. Although Jiménez de Quesada named the territories the New Kingdom of Granada, the region was initially placed under the jurisdiction of the Governorate of Cartagena. A Royal Audiencia was established in 1548 as part of the Viceroyalty of Peru, and beginning in 1564, presidents were appointed to govern it. Throughout these years, the territories expanded until they encompassed what is now Colombia.

On March 9, 1687, in the city of Santafé and its surrounding areas, a loud noise accompanied by a sulfurous odor caused panic among the population. Its origin could not be determined. The expression “en el tiempo del ruido” (“in the time of the noise”) subsequently emerged as a way of referring to events from a very distant past. In 1717, the territory was established as a viceroyalty, which was suspended in 1724 and restored in 1739. It continued until the independence movement of 1810, was restored for the final time in 1816 during the Spanish reconquest, and was definitively abolished in 1819 following independence. Cundinamarca was also the site of episodes of the Comuneros' Revolt in La Mesa, Villeta, Guaduas, and Bituima.

=== Independence ===
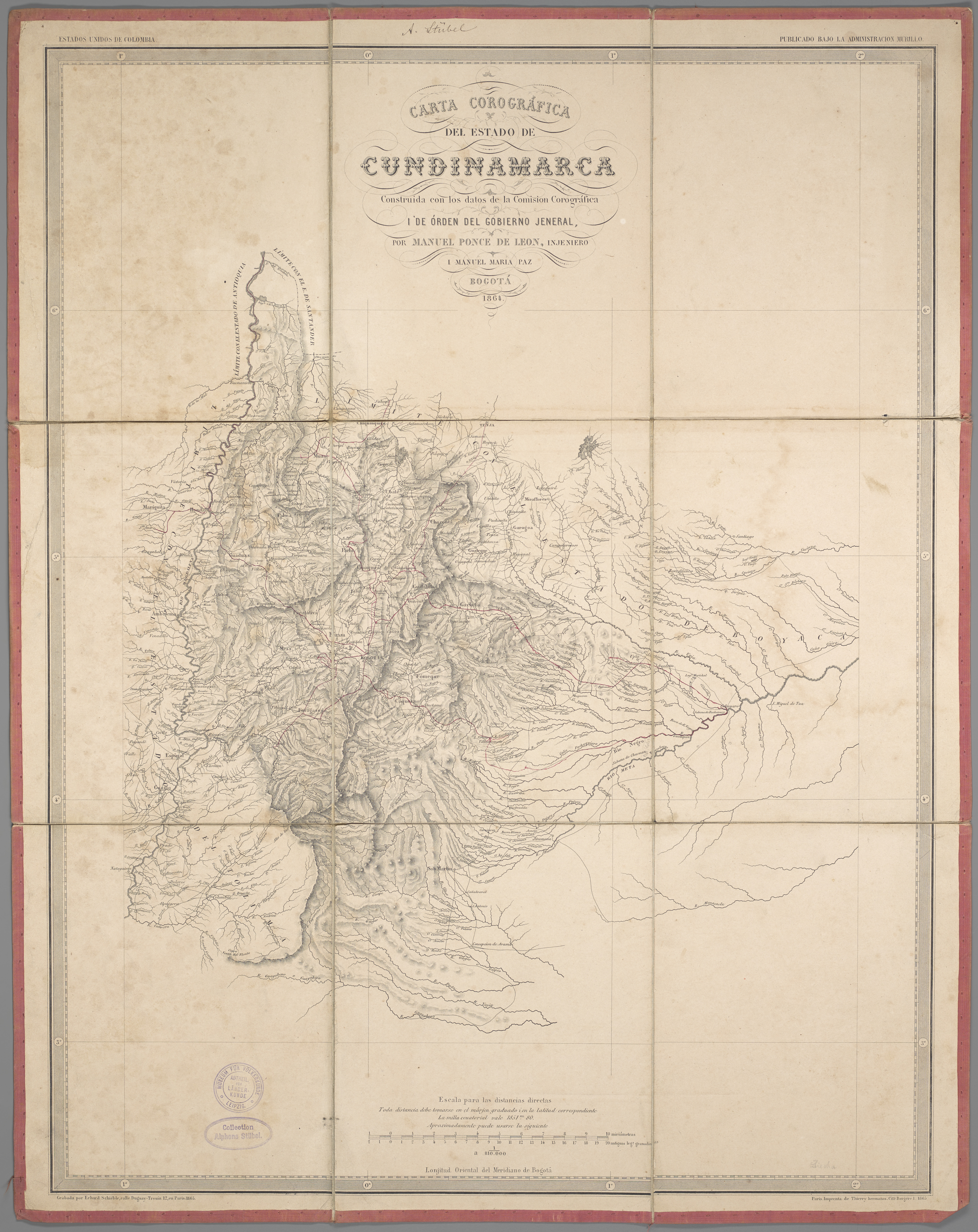
The Sovereign State of Cundinamarca

The struggle for independence began in Cundinamarca on July 16, 1813. It was there that the name “Cundinamarca” came to prominence when the centralists, under the leadership of Antonio Nariño, sought to create a unified and centralized state under that name. Meanwhile, the federalists led by Camilo Torres fought to establish the United Provinces of New Granada. This period of civil war facilitated the Spanish reconquest in 1816. Along with Boyacá, Casanare, Norte de Santander, and Santander, Cundinamarca became a center of resistance in New Granada, with the Guerrilla of the Almeyda Brothers and other smaller groups operating in the region. In the Tocaima area, these groups were led by José Antonio Olaya Bolívar and José Ignacio Rodríguez Obregón. Following the Battle of Boyacá, independence was achieved, and the name Cundinamarca was extended to all of New Granada.

In 1831, New Granada separated from Gran Colombia, and the territory became one of its departments. Due to various political and administrative changes, this territorial entity was divided into several provinces, including Bogotá. Bogotá subsequently became the Sovereign State of Cundinamarca (Estado Soberana de Cundinamarca) on June 15, 1857, through the union of the New Granadan provinces of Bogotá, Mariquita, Neiva, Tequendama, Zipaquirá, and the Territory of San Martín. This state existed during the period of the Granadine Confederation and later the United States of Colombia, under the authority of federal constitutions.

In 1886, following the adoption of a new political constitution, Cundinamarca became a department with the establishment of the new Republic of Colombia. Interestingly, President Manuel Antonio Sanclemente governed from Villeta because he could not tolerate the cold climate of the republic's capital.

=== 20th and 21st centuries ===
In 1905, Cundinamarca was divided for the final time into the department of the same name, with its capital in Facatativá; the Department of Quesada, with its capital in Zipaquirá; and the Capital District of Bogotá. These changes resulted from the political reforms of Rafael Reyes and remained in effect until 1910.

During the dictatorship of Gustavo Rojas Pinilla, Bogotá was declared a Special District, definitively separating it from the department along with the then-municipalities of Bosa, Engativá, Fontibón, Suba, Usaquén, and Usme. This separation was confirmed by the 1991 Constitution, which reestablished Bogotá as a Capital District. As a result, alternative proposals have been made to designate various municipalities—including Zipaquirá, Girardot, Chía, Fusagasugá, Facatativá, and Soacha—as the departmental capital. The proposal to make Soacha the capital was rejected by the Congress of the Republic in October 2022.

== Geography ==
Most of Cundinamarca is on the Eastern Cordillera (Cordillera Oriental), just south of Boyacá, bordered by the Magdalena River on the west, reaching down into the Orinoco River basin on the east, and bordering on Tolima to the south. The capital district of Bogotá is nearly completely surrounded by Cundinamarca territory and was formed by carving up Cundinamarca. Because of this and other border changes, the present department of Cundinamarca is much smaller than the original state.

== Demography and ethnography ==
Entity	Population (2023E)	Area (km^{2})	Area (square miles)	Density (per km^{2})	GDP (billion US$)
Cundinamarca (without Bogotá)	3,577,200	22,623	8,735	160	21.6
Bogotá	7,968,100	1,587	613	4,909	83.9
Cundinamarca and Bogotá	11,545,300	24,210	9,348	476	105.5

Historical population
Year	Pop.	±%
1973	1,125,642	—
1985	1,512,928	+34.4%
1993	1,875,337	+24.0%
2005	2,280,037	+21.6%
2018	2,919,060	+28.0%

=== Municipalities with over 50,000 inhabitants ===
==== Municipal population position ====
According to the latest census conducted in 2005, 2,280,037 people live in Cundinamarca, excluding 6,776,009 of the capital, Bogotá.

The city of Bogotá and the municipalities of Soacha, La Calera, Cota, Chía, Madrid, Funza, Mosquera, Fusagasugá, Facatativá and Zipaquirá form a single metropolitan area.

Rank	City or municipality	Inhabitants (1985)	Inhabitants (1993)	Inhabitants (2005)	Inhabitants (2015)*	Inhabitants (2020)*
1	Soacha	132,758	254,625	401,996	511,262	567,546
2	Fusagasugá	63,886	82,003	108,949	134,523	147,631
3	Facatativá	55,324	75,711	107,463	132,106	144,149
4	Zipaquirá	60,202	75,166	101,562	122,347	132,419
5	Chía	38,862	55,742	97,907	126,647	141,917
6	Girardot	81,019	90,904	97,889	105,085	107,796
7	Mosquera	16,505	22,250	63,237	82,750	93,461
8	Madrid	33,795	42,584	62,436	77,627	85,090
9	Funza	31,366	41,119	61,391	75,350	82,321
10	Cajicá	23,618	31,316	45,391	56,875	62,713
Source: DANE *projection

==== Important cities ====
Cundinamarca is made up of 116 municipalities, six of which recorded a population of over 100,000 and could be considered as cities: Soacha, Fusagasugá, Girardot, Facatativá, Zipaquirá and Chia, while Bogotá District is in the category of capital.

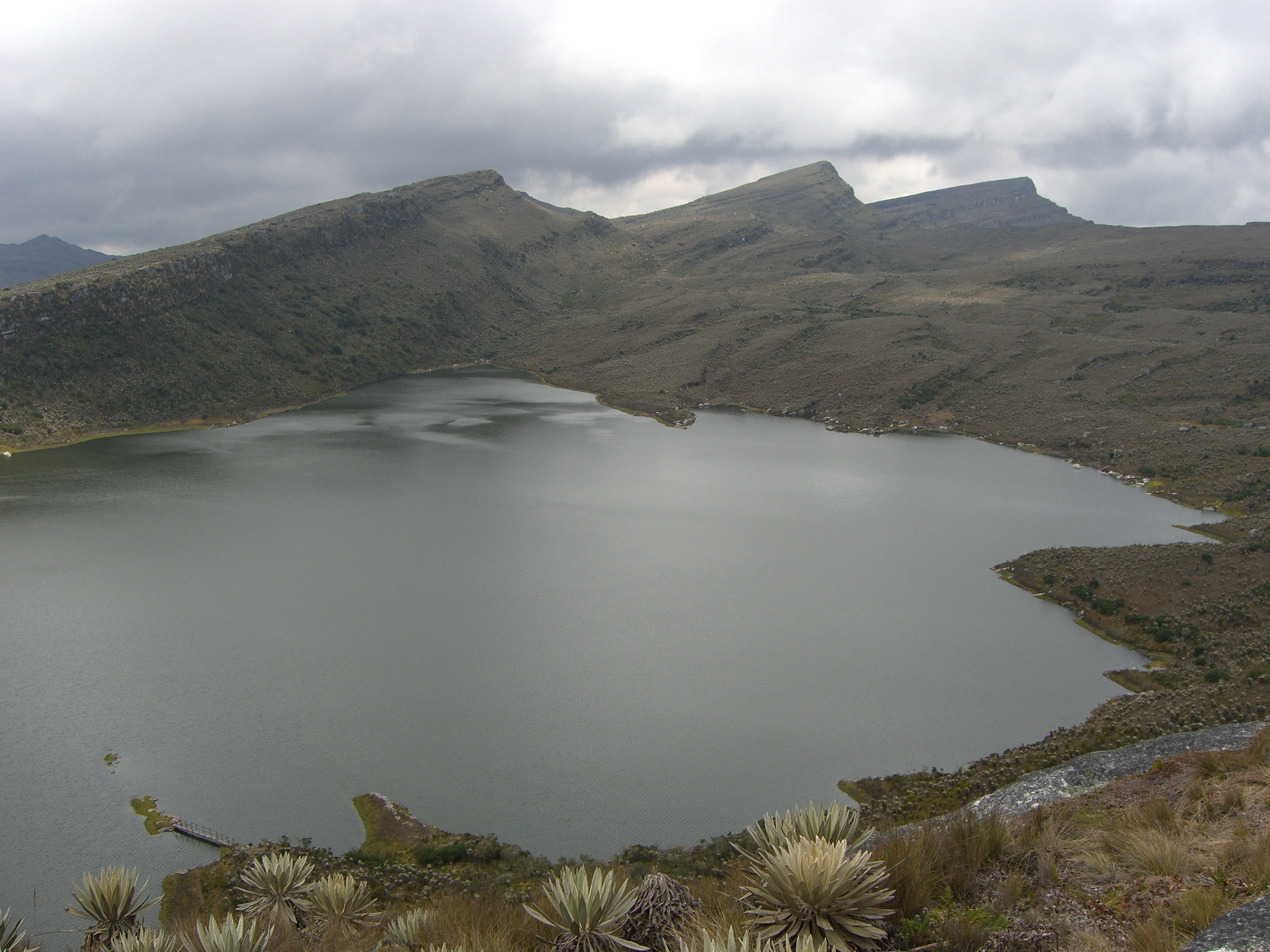
Chisaca Lake on the Sumapaz Paramo

- Metropolitan Area of Bogotá: Comprises the towns of Soacha, Facatativá, Chia, Madrid, Funza, and Mosquera, among others. Its activities are centered in the industrial sector. Estate activity is important especially in the suburbs closer to Bogotá: Chía, La Calera and Tocancipá.
- Girardot: In the far southwest and bordering department of Tolima, is the capital of the Upper Magdalena Province. Its main economic activity is trade, as a result of a major tourist dynamics and its proximity to major agricultural areas of Tolima. It has a college and important trade fairs and events.
- Fusagasugá is located between Bogotá and Girardot, and it is an hour of each city. The capital city of the Province of Sumapaz, it is an important focus of agricultural marketing and regional services, standing out as an educational city with a large university and an increasing population trend. Its economy is mainly focused on trade and agricultural marketing, with a significant production of ornamental plants and flowers for export, for which it is known as the garden city of Colombia.
- Zipaquirá: Despite being part of the metropolitan area of Bogotá, it has managed to position itself as one of the most important centers of Colombia's salt mining industry. Its economy is focused on commerce and services.

Other major towns are Ubaté due to high livestock and dairy production. Guaduas, is an important cultural center. Chocontá and Fred are agricultural centers.

== Provinces ==
Cundinamarca has 15 provinces and the Capital District (Bogotá), which simultaneously acts as capital of the Republic, capital of the department and a separately administered district (or department) in itself.

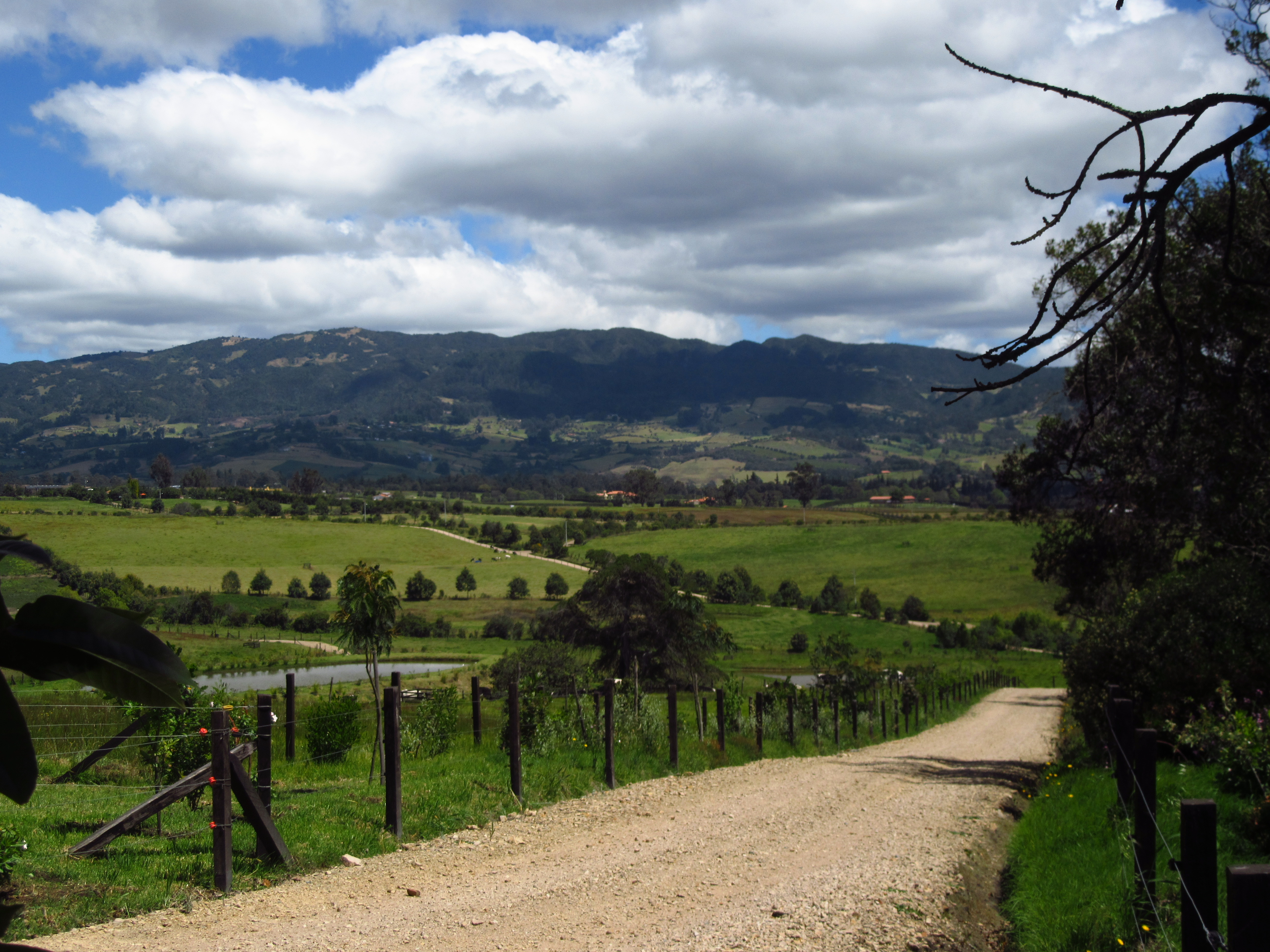
Subachoque valley in Western Savanna Province

1. Almeidas
2. Upper Magdalena (Alto Magdalena)
3. Lower Magdalena (Bajo Magdalena)
4. Gualivá
5. Guavio
6. Central Magdalena (Magdalena Centro)
7. Medina
8. Eastern (Oriente)
9. Rionegro
10. Central Savanna (Sabana Centro)
11. Western Savanna (Sabana Occidente)
12. Soacha
13. Sumapaz
14. Tequendama
15. Ubaté

== Tourism ==
- Chingaza National Natural Park
- La Chorrera Falls, one of the tallest waterfalls in the world
- Cucunubá, wool capital of Colombia
- Lake Guatavita
- Salt Cathedral of Zipaquirá
- Sumapaz Páramo
- Tequendama Falls
- Tominé Reservoir

== Sports ==
The department is home to the basketball team Cóndores de Cundinamarca, which plays its home games in the Coliseo de la Luna in Chía.

== See also ==
- Altiplano Cundiboyacense
- Postage stamps and postal history of Cundinamarca
- 1939 Gachetá massacre
