= List of largest metropolitan areas in the Americas =

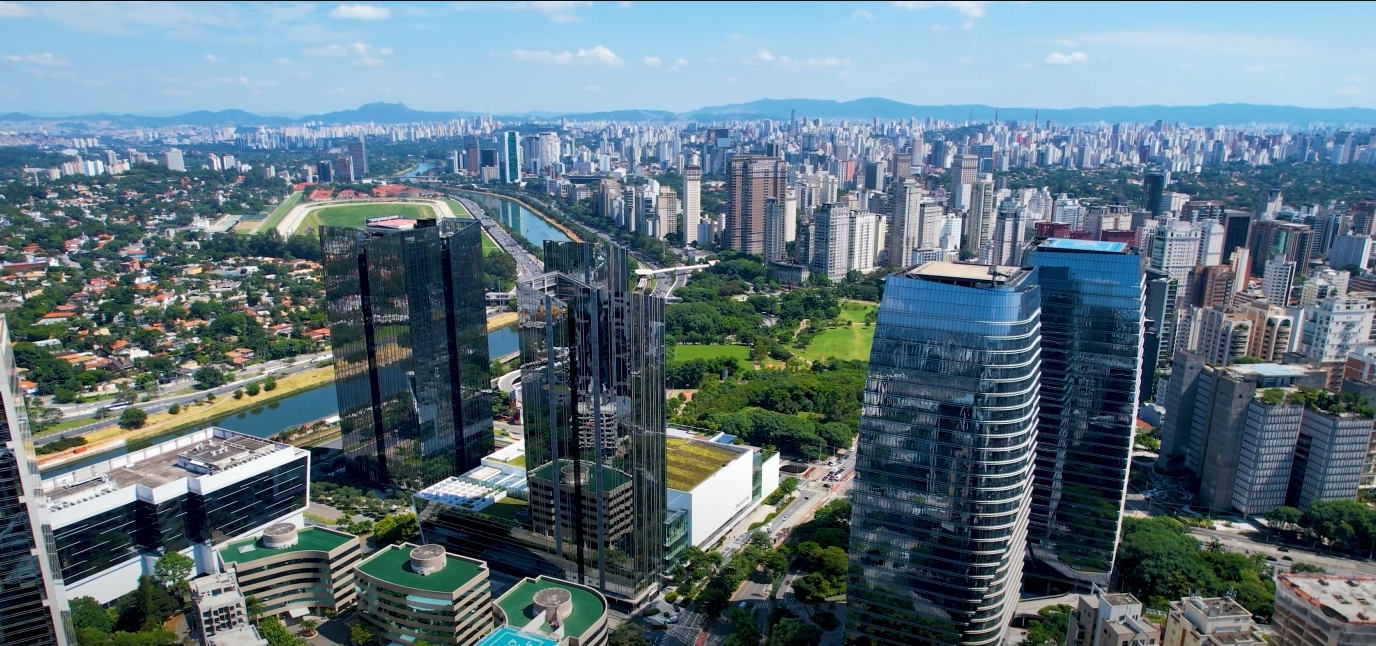
The São Paulo metropolitan area is the most populous metropolitan area in the Americas, with a population of 23,443,587 as of 2022.

This list of largest metropolitan areas in the Americas has the top 50 most populous as of the most recent census results or projections. It is impossible to definitively compare and rank areas, because each country may set its own definition of metropolitan area. Where available, it uses official definitions of metropolitan areas based on one urban core and immediate surroundings, as opposed to polycentric conurbations. Population data are the most recent census results or projections from the authoritative national agency responsible for demographics.

== List ==
	Metropolitan area	Country	State/Province	Population	Year	Notes
1	São Paulo	Brazil	São Paulo	21,555,260	2025	(Note: The population estimate for this metro area was calculated by taking the list of municipalities officially considered to be in the metro area by the Brazilian government and adding each municipality's population, hence why two sources are listed here.)
2	Mexico City	Mexico	Mexico City; State of Mexico; Hidalgo; Morelos	21,436,911	2020	
3	New York	United States	New York; New Jersey; Connecticut; Pennsylvania	20,112,448	2025	
4	Buenos Aires	Argentina	Buenos Aires Province	16,700,000	2022	(Note: INDEC defines Greater Buenos Aires as comprising the Autonomous City of Buenos Aires plus 24 partidos of Buenos Aires Province, namely Almirante Brown, Avellaneda, Berazategui, Esteban Echeverría, Ezeiza, Florencio Varela, Hurlingham, Ituzaingó, José C. Paz, La Matanza, Lanús, Lomas de Zamora, Malvinas Argentinas, Merlo, Moreno, Morón, Quilmes, San Fernando, San Isidro, San Miguel, Tigre and Vicente López.)
5	Rio de Janeiro	Brazil	Rio de Janeiro	12,937,950	2025	(Note: The population estimate for this metro area was calculated by taking the list of municipalities officially considered to be in the metro area by the Brazilian government and adding each municipality's population, hence why two sources are listed here.)
6	Los Angeles	United States	California	12,844,441	2025	
7	Bogotá	Colombia	Bogotá; Cundinamarca	12,772,828	2022	(Note: DANE defines the metropolitan area of Bogotá as comprising the Capital District and 17 municipalities in Cundinamarca: Soacha, Facatativá, Zipaquirá, Chía, Mosquera, Madrid, Funza, Cajicá, Sibaté, Tocancipá, La Calera, Sopó, Tabio, Tenjo, Cota, Gachancipá and Bojacá.)
8	Lima	Peru	Lima province Callao	11,283,787	2022	(Note: INEI defines the Lima Metropolitan Area as comprising Lima Province and the Constitutional Province of Callao.)
9	Chicago	United States	Illinois; Indiana; Wisconsin	9,434,123	2025	
10	Dallas–Fort Worth	United States	Texas; Oklahoma	8,477,157	2025	
11	Houston	United States	Texas	7,904,627	2025	
12	Santiago	Chile	Santiago Metropolitan Region	7,400,741	2024	
13	Toronto	Canada	Ontario	7,108,874	2025	
14	Atlanta	United States	(Georgia (U.S. state)) Georgia; Alabama	6,482,182	2025	
15	Washington	United States	Washington, D.C. Maryland; Virginia; West Virginia	6,465,724	2025	
16	Miami	United States	Florida	6,391,072	2025	
17	Philadelphia	United States	Pennsylvania; New Jersey; Delaware; Maryland	6,329,118	2025	
18	San Diego–Tijuana	United States; Mexico	California; Baja California	5,433,988	2025	(Note: This uses Indicadores de Población Tijuana 2025.pdf. It is also in spanish.) (Note: This is the San Diego MSA population added to the Tijuana metro population.)
19	Belo Horizonte	Brazil	Minas Gerais	5,383,386	2025	(Note: The population estimate for this metro area was calculated by taking the list of municipalities officially considered to be in the metro area by the Brazilian government and adding each municipality's population, hence why two sources are listed here.)
20	Monterrey	Mexico	Nuevo León	5,322,117	2020	
21	Maracaibo	Venezuela	Zulia	5,278,448	2010	
22	Guadalajara	Mexico	Jalisco	5,110,617	2020	
23	Caracas	Venezuela	(Caracas) Capital District; Miranda; Vargas	5,243,301	2011	
24	Phoenix	United States	Arizona	5,228,938	2025	
25	Boston	United States	Massachusetts; New Hampshire; Rhode Island	5,034,221	2025	
26	Detroit–Windsor	United States; Canada	Michigan; Ontario; Ohio	4,879,651	2025	(Note: The figure in this table takes the MSA population of Detroit and adds it to the metropolitan population of Windsor, Canada.)
27	Brasília	Brazil	Federal District; Goiás	4,769,389	2025	(Note: The population estimate for this metro area was calculated by taking the list of municipalities officially considered to be in the metro area by the Brazilian government and adding each municipality's population, hence why two sources are listed here.)
28	Inland Empire (Riverside)	United States	California	4,769,007	2025	
29	San Francisco	United States	California	4,630,041	2025	
30	Montreal	Canada	Quebec	4,597,837	2025	
30	Porto Alegre	Brazil	Rio Grande do Sul	4,346,993	2025	(Note: The population estimate for this metro area was calculated by taking the list of municipalities officially considered to be in the metro area by the Brazilian government and adding each municipality's population, hence why two sources are listed here.)
31	Santo Domingo	Dominican Republic	Distrito Nacional; Santo Domingo Province	4,274,651	2022	
32	Fortaleza	Brazil	Ceará	4,154,961	2025	(Note: The population estimate for this metro area was calculated by taking the list of municipalities officially considered to be in the metro area by the Brazilian government and adding each municipality's population, hence why two sources are listed here.)
33	Seattle	United States	Washington	4,161,883	2025	
34	Medellín	Colombia	Antioquia	4,068,000	2022	
35	Salvador	Brazil	Bahia	3,919,864	2022	
36	Recife	Brazil	Pernambuco	3,743,854	2022	
37	Curitiba	Brazil	Paraná	3,731,769	2022	
38	Minneapolis–Saint Paul	United States	Minnesota; Wisconsin	3,790,295	2025	
39	Campinas	Brazil	São Paulo	3,656,363	2022	
40	Tampa–St. Petersburg	United States	Florida	3,418,895	2025	
41	San Jose	Costa Rica	San José Province; Alajuela; Cartago Province; Heredia	3,160,000	2011	
42	Guatemala City	Guatemala	Guatemala Department	3,160,000	2024	
43	Guayaquil	Ecuador	Guayas	3,092,000	2022	
44	Denver	United States	Colorado	3,092,037	2025	
45	Vancouver	Canada	British Columbia	3,088,036	2025	
46	Orlando	United States	Florida	2,957,672	2025	
47	Port-au-Prince	Haiti	Ouest	2,915,000	2022	
48	Quito	Ecuador	Pichincha	2,889,703	2022	
49	Baltimore	United States	Maryland	2,857,781	2025	
50	Cali	Colombia	Valle del Cauca	2,837,000	2022	
