= Bogotá-Cundinamarca Metropolitan Region =

Bogotá-Cundinamarca Metropolitan Region Región metropolitana Bogotá-Cundinamarca
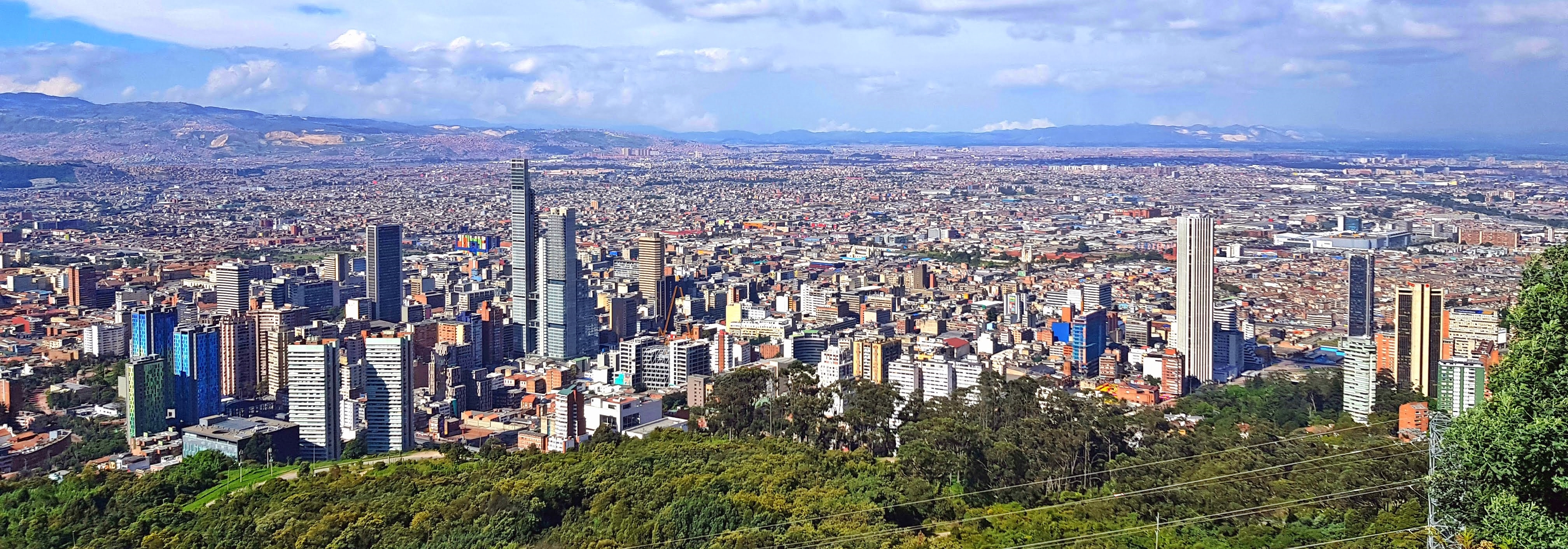
- Bogota

- The Metropolitan Area of Bogotá within Cundinamarca Department and Bogotá, Capital District
- Country: Colombia

Area
  - Metro: 5,235 km^{2} (2,021 sq mi)

Population
  - Metro: 10,034,325
  - Metro density: 1,917/km^{2} (4,964/sq mi)

GDP
  - Metro: US$ 121.8 billion (2023)
  - Per capita: US$ 10,500 (2023)

Bogotá-Cundinamarca Metropolitan Region is the metropolitan area of Colombian capital city of Bogotá, usually used for statistical analysis or technical use. It is not a formal administrative division and its limits are therefore not defined.

A study defined the Metropolitan Area of Bogotá as the territory of the Capital District and 17 of the surrounding municipalities in the Department of Cundinamarca; Soacha, Facatativá, Zipaquirá, Chía, Mosquera, Madrid, Funza, Cajicá, Sibaté, Tocancipá, La Calera, Sopó, Tabio, Tenjo, Cota, Gachancipá and Bojacá. Bogotá and its metropolitan area (ranging in altitude from 1,800 metres (5,900 ft) to 4,200 metres (13,800 ft)) had a population of 9.8 million in 2015.

== Metropolitan Area of the Bogotá Savanna ==
This possible definition of the Metropolitan Area for Bogotá would include the Capital District with its 20 localities adding the municipalities of Soacha, Mosquera, Funza, Madrid, Chía, Cajicá, Cota, La Calera, Tenjo, Tabio, Sibaté, Zipaquirá and Facatativá (In the 2005 Census, DANE also additioned Bojacá, Gachancipá, Tocancipá and Sopó). These possible definitions for a metropolitan area of Bogotá has not been established due to the resistance of these municipalities to lose autonomy.

=== Population by municipality (2019 census) ===
Bogotá, Capital District (with 20 localities)	7.412.566
Soacha	660.179
Facatativá	141.762
Chía	132.181
Zipaquirá	130.537
Mosquera	130.221
Madrid	112.254
Funza	93.154
Cajicá	82.244
Tocancipá	39.996
Sibaté	33.491
Cota	32.691
La Calera	29.868
Sopó	25.782
Tenjo	21.935
Tabio	21.665
Gachancipá	17.062
Bojacá	9.913

=== Soacha and Sibaté ===
Soacha is the only municipality in which the urban area has conurbated with Bogotá, specifically with the localities of Bosa and Ciudad Bolívar. Sibaté conurbated with the municipality of Soacha integrating it also to Bogota.

=== Municipalities partially integrated ===
The urban perimeter of Bogotá extends to the Bogotá River where it limits with the municipalities of Mosquera, Funza and Cota. In this area there is an ongoing urban development, mostly industrial, that will eventually conurbate with Bogotá, the same applies to the municipality of La Calera. The urban areas of the municipalities of Cota and Chía are already intersecting with the Capital District. Chia and Cajicá's urban areas are also conurbated.

=== Commuter towns ===
The possible Metropolitan Area of the Bogotá Savanna would include the three main urban concentrations Bogotá, Facatativá and Zipaquirá, the last two growing as economic and industrial hubs. Among the towns that would become commuter towns for the City of Bogotá are Mosquera, Funza, Madrid, Chía, Cajicá, Cota, La Calera, Tenjo, Tabio, Sibaté, Zipaquirá and Facatativá. As urban centers Facatativá would serve also as working center for Madrid, El Rosal and Subachoque. Zipaquirá by the towns of Chía, Cajicá, Tabio, Tenjo and Sopó, among others.
