= Metropolitan areas of Colombia =

Metropolitan area
- Metropolitan areas in force in red, recognized in orange, de facto in amber.
- Category: Intermediate level of administrative division
- Location: Colombia
- Found in: Departments
- Created: 1980
- Number: 8 (as of 2024)
- Subdivisions: Municipalities

In Colombia, a metropolitan area is, according to Law 1625 of 2013, an administrative entity formed by a group of two or more municipalities integrated around a municipality that serves as the core or metropolis. Because these entities are linked to each other by close physical, economic and social ties, coordinated administration is required for the planning of their development and the rational provision of their public services. Metropolitan areas are endowed with legal personality under public law, administrative autonomy, their own assets and their own authorities. About 8 metropolitan areas have been configured or recognized in Colombia.

== Characteristics ==
One of the characteristics of metropolitan areas is that a large share of their inhabitants commute daily to work in the central urban core, which is why these surrounding towns are called bedroom communities (poblaciones dormitorio), that is, places where their inhabitants only go to sleep and to spend the weekend.

An important aspect of metropolitan areas is that they allow joint planning programs among the municipalities, thus permitting orderly growth proportional to the strengths of each town. For example, promoting industry in one town, housing in another and tourism in another, according to the needs of the Area and the characteristics of each municipality.

== Officially recognized and configured metropolitan areas ==
These are the metropolitan areas officially recognized and configured under Colombian law:

General information on metropolitan areas of Colombia
Name	Department	Core city	Date of creation	Number of municipalities	Population
Metropolitan Area of the Aburrá Valley	Antioquia	Medellín	1980	10	4,320,748
Metropolitan Area of Bucaramanga	Santander	Bucaramanga	1981	4	1,570,540
Metropolitan Area of Barranquilla	Atlántico	Barranquilla	1981	5	2,326,292
Metropolitan Area of Cúcuta	Norte de Santander	Cúcuta	1991	6	1,046,347
Centro Occidente Metropolitan Area	Risaralda	Pereira	1991	3	819,236
Metropolitan Area of Valledupar	Cesar	Valledupar	2005	5	691,266
Centro Sur de Caldas Metropolitan Area	Caldas	Manizales	2023	4	570,754
Metropolitan Area of Southwestern Colombia	Valle del Cauca and Cauca	Cali	2024	3	2,505,573

=== By order of creation ===
- Metropolitan Area of the Aburrá Valley: Created by Ordinance No. 34 of 20 November 1980. Made up of the municipalities of Medellín (now a Special District), Bello, Barbosa, Copacabana, La Estrella, Girardota, Itagüí, Caldas, Sabaneta and Envigado (which rejoined the association in 2016 by popular consultation). Like all of them, its original competence (since 1980) is to act as a metropolitan planning body and to develop projects, with the construction of works of metropolitan scope, all in accordance with Organic Law 1625 of 2013, which repealed Organic Law 128 of 1994. From 1994 until 2024 it was the only metropolitan area in Colombia that acted as the Urban Environmental Authority, a competence it assumes under articles 55 and 66 of Law 99 of 1993, in conjunction with subparagraph j) of article 7 of Law 1625 of 2013. Like some other metropolitan areas, it also acts as the metropolitan transport authority (Decree 170 of 2001). Likewise, since 2017, pursuant to article 79 of Law 1955 of 2019 and Decree 1983 of 31 October 2019, it performs by delegation the functions of cadastral manager for the municipalities of Bello, Copacabana, Girardota, Barbosa and Sabaneta.
- Metropolitan Area of Bucaramanga: Created by Ordinance No. 20 of 1981. Made up of the municipalities of Bucaramanga, Floridablanca (Note: Municipalities conurbated with the capital or main city of the metropolitan area.) and Girón. Piedecuesta was incorporated in 1986.
- Metropolitan Area of Barranquilla: Created by Ordinance 28 of 1981. Made up of the municipalities of Barranquilla, Puerto Colombia, Soledad, Malambo (Note: Municipalities conurbated with other municipalities of the metropolitan area.) and Galapa.
- Metropolitan Area of Cúcuta: Created by Decree No. 000508 of 1991. Made up of Cúcuta, Villa del Rosario, Los Patios, El Zulia, San Cayetano and Puerto Santander.
- Centro Occidente Metropolitan Area: Created by Ordinance 001 of 15 December 1981. Initially made up of the municipalities of Pereira and Dosquebradas. The municipality of La Virginia was later incorporated by Ordinance 014 of March 1991.
- Metropolitan Area of Valledupar: Created in 2005. Made up of the municipalities of Valledupar, Agustín Codazzi, La Paz, Manaure Balcón del Cesar and San Diego.
- Centro Sur de Caldas Metropolitan Area: Officially constituted following the popular consultation held in the Centro Sur subregion of the department of Caldas on 26 November 2023. Made up of the municipalities of Manizales, Villamaría, Neira and Palestina.
- Metropolitan Area of Southwestern Colombia: Officially constituted following the popular consultation held on 24 November 2024. Made up of Cali, Jamundí and Puerto Tejada.

== Conditions for the creation of a metropolitan area ==
When two or more municipalities form a group with the characteristics of a metropolitan area, they may constitute themselves as such, in accordance with the following rules:

- The following have the initiative to promote its creation: the mayors of the municipalities concerned, one third of the councillors of those municipalities, or five percent (5%) of the citizens on the electoral roll, totaled across those same municipalities.
- The promoters of the metropolitan area shall draw up the project for the constitution of the new administrative entity, specifying at least the following aspects: the municipalities that would make up the area; the core municipality or metropolis; and the reasons that justify its creation.
- The project shall be delivered to the Registraduría del Estado Civil (National Civil Registry) so that, within ten business days following the date of receipt, it publishes and disseminates it for the purpose of broad debate.
- The Registraduría shall call a popular consultation for a specific date, which shall be at least three months after the day the project was made public and which must coincide with the dates provided for municipal consultations in the statutory law on mechanisms of citizen participation. The Registraduría del Estado Civil shall provide the necessary means for organizing the popular consultation.
- The text of the project for the constitution of the metropolitan area shall be submitted to popular consultation, which shall be deemed approved by the affirmative vote of the majority of voters. A new popular consultation on the same matter may only be called after the municipal councils have been renewed.
- Once the popular consultation has taken place, and if the result is favorable, the mayors and the presidents of the respective municipal councils shall formalize the constitution of the Area within a period of no more than thirty days, and shall define its powers, financing and authorities in accordance with this Law, at the First Notary Office of the core municipality or metropolis, as well as the general functions that the metropolitan entity shall perform, particularly in matters of planning, public works, public services and works of economic and social development.

== Unofficial metropolitan areas ==
- Bogotá-Cundinamarca Metropolitan Region: made up of the capital district of Bogotá and the Cundinamarca municipalities surrounding it.
- Metropolitan Area of Armenia: it would be made up of the municipalities of Armenia, Calarcá, Circasia, La Tebaida, Montenegro and Salento.
- Metropolitan Area of Cartagena de Indias: it would be made up of the municipalities of Cartagena de Indias, Turbaco, Turbana, Clemencia and Santa Rosa de Lima.
- Metropolitan Area of the Banana Axis (Eje Bananero): made up of Apartadó, Carepa, Chigorodó and Turbo.
- Metropolitan Area of Girardot: it would be made up of Girardot, Ricaurte (both in Cundinamarca) and Flandes (in Tolima).
- Metropolitan Area of Montería: made up of Montería, Cereté, San Carlos, Ciénaga de Oro and San Pelayo.
- Metropolitan Area of Neiva: made up of Neiva, Rivera, Palermo, Tello, Campoalegre, Baraya, Aipe and Villavieja.
- Metropolitan Area of San Juan de Pasto: made up of the municipalities of Pasto, Chachagüí, Nariño, La Florida, Tangua and Yacuanquer.
- Piedemonte Amazónico Metropolitan Area: made up of Florencia, Morelia and Montañita.
- Metropolitan Area of Sincelejo: it would be made up of the municipalities of Sincelejo, Corozal, Morroa, Los Palmitos and Sampués.
- Metropolitan Area of Tunja: made up of Tunja, Sora, Soracá, Siachoque, Toca, Tuta, Sotaquirá, Cómbita, Motavita, Chiquiza, Oicatá, Chivatá, Cucaita, Samacá and Ventaquemada.
- Metropolitan Area of the San Nicolás Valley: made up of Rionegro, Marinilla, El Carmen de Viboral, Guarne, La Ceja, El Retiro and El Santuario.
- Metropolitan Area of Villavicencio: made up of Villavicencio, Acacías, Guamal, Restrepo and Cumaral.

== Binational or trinational ==
- Binational conurbation Arauca–El Amparo: made up of Arauca (Colombia), and El Amparo and Guasdualito (Venezuela).
- Binational conurbation Ipiales–Tulcán: made up of Ipiales, Aldana, Carlosama, Potosí and Pupiales (Colombia), and Tulcán and Urbina (Ecuador).
- Binational conurbation Norte de Santander – Táchira: made up of Cúcuta, Villa del Rosario, Los Patios, El Zulia, San Cayetano and Puerto Santander (Colombia), and San Antonio, Ureña and Tienditas (Venezuela).
- Trinational conurbation Leticia–Tabatinga: made up of Leticia (Colombia), Tabatinga (Brazil) and Santa Rosa (Peru).

== National conurbations ==
A conurbation is formed when two or more municipal seats are joined together and their urban boundaries cannot be clearly distinguished.

Antioquia

- Bello, Caldas, Copacabana, Envigado, Itagüí, La Estrella, Medellín and Sabaneta.

Atlántico

- Barranquilla, Puerto Colombia, Soledad and Malambo.
- Santo Tomás and Palmar de Varela.

Caldas

- Manizales and Villamaría.
- La Dorada and Puerto Salgar.

Cundinamarca

- Bogotá and Soacha
- Funza and Mosquera
- Chía and Cajicá

Risaralda

- Pereira and Dosquebradas
- La Virginia and Caimalito

Norte de Santander

- Cúcuta, Los Patios and Villa del Rosario

Santander

- Bucaramanga and Floridablanca

Sucre

- Santiago de Tolú and Coveñas
- Corozal and Morroa

Tolima

- Honda and Puerto Bogotá

== See also ==
- List of municipalities of Colombia by area
- Municipalities of Colombia
- Districts of Colombia
- List of metropolitan areas of Colombia by population
- List of departments of Colombia by population
