= Luz Marina Bernal =

Colombian peace and human rights activist

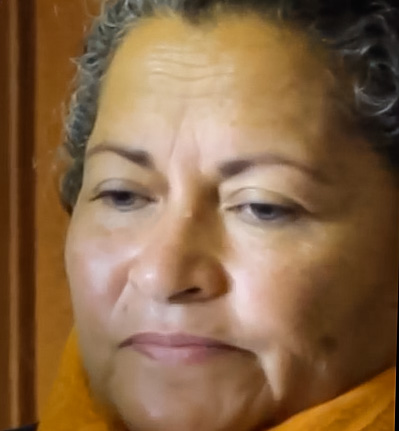
- Born: Luz Marina Bernal Parra; 1960 (age 65–66); Soacha, Colombia
- Organization: Mothers of Soacha
- Political party: Lista de la Decencia

Luz Marina Bernal Parra (born 1960) is a Colombian peace and human rights activist, a founding member of the group Mothers of Soacha (Spanish: Madres de Soacha). She was nominated for the Nobel Peace Prize in 2016 and has been a champion of the struggle of women whose children were kidnapped and murdered by members of the Colombian Army to the south of Bogotá, who passed them off as guerrillas – the so-called "false positives". She managed to get Álvaro Uribe, the President of Colombia, to retract statements insulting the memory of the young people of Soacha, presented as guerrillas killed in combat during his democratic security policy. A judgment of reparation was handed down in 2014.

After a decade working as a defender of human rights, in March 2018 she stood for election to the Senate as part of Lista de la Decencia.

== Son's disappearance in 2008 ==
Luz Marina Bernal is the mother of Fraí Leonardo Bernal, who was murdered by the Colombian Army, and driving force of the group Mothers of Soacha, a group of women who denounced the killings of their children by the armed forces. The Office of the Attorney General has recognized the murder of her son as a crime against humanity, along with the disappearance of more than 4,500 young people. They are called the "false positives".

Bernal had to face the disappearance of her son, who was 26 years old and suffered from a mental disability that caused him to function at a 10-year-old level. The last time she saw him was on 8 January 2008, when he left home in Soacha, a city of 800,000 located three hours south of Bogotá.

The Soacha police did not search for the missing youths despite the complaints of the mothers, who tried to find them with no results. A doctor from the forensic office called Bernal nine months later to warn her that her son's body was in the morgue of Ocaña, Norte de Santander, 700 kilometers north of Soacha. The autopsy revealed that Fraí Leonardo Bernal died four days after his disappearance after being shot in the face. His mother was not surprised at this detail, given that her son could not fend for himself and lacked the capacity to become a guerrilla.

== Context of war in Colombia ==
Toward the end of President Álvaro Uribe's second term, from 2006 to 2010, he gave impetus to a program to weaken armed guerrilla groups in Colombia. The government's defense minister signed a document offering rewards to soldiers who captured or killed guerrillas, as human rights organizations have brought to the attention of international bodies. It was ministerial directive number 29 that established:

the payment of rewards for the capture or subduing in combat of armed organizations outside the law, material of war, administration, or communications, and information on activities related to drug trafficking, and payment for information that serves as a basis for the continuation of intelligence work and the subsequent planning of operations.

Defenders of human rights and the Mothers of Soacha have explained how the scheme worked:

The military went to the poor neighborhoods of Colombia like Soacha to approach young people, mostly sons of single mothers in marginal areas, with the aim of gaining their trust and confidence. Once they managed to take them far from their communities, the military executed these young "soldiers" and presented this as a battle against the guerrillas.

== Mothers of Soacha ==
In two years, from 2008 to 2010, there were 19 cases of disappearance in Soacha. In response, women gathered at police stations, offices of the Attorney General, and other spaces. They ended up uniting under the designation of the collective Mothers of Soacha. María Sanabria's son disappeared in the same manner as Luz Marina Bernal's, so she and Bernal decided to fight for justice together.

From 2010 to 2014, these women protested weekly in Soacha's central plaza, with the support of human rights and neighborhood organizations. The protests were widely covered in Colombia's social media. In addition, in those years Bernal led petitions in more than ten countries on behalf of Mothers of Soacha, placing a focus on the Colombian justice system and its officials.

Among the tasks performed by the members of the collective in Soacha were photographing the groups of soldiers when they were conducting raids and taking away young detainees in trucks, as well as asking the latter for their phone numbers to call their families immediately.

Mothers of Soacha is an initiative backed by organizations such as Amnesty International. Despite the slow pace of the process, they continue to oppose impunity and to promote the actions of the Colombian justice system against inhumanity.

== Results on "false positives" ==
Through the end of 2014, the Office of the Attorney General of Colombia acknowledged receiving complaints of 4,716 murders allegedly committed by members of the security forces, which fit the characteristics of cases such as those of Jaime Estiven, the son of María Sanabria. The Office also reported that approximately 4,000 members of the Army were involved in these cases. As of that date, about 900 soldiers had been indicted.

The United Nations published a report in early 2014 that reflected the slowness of the judicial system against these cases known as "false positives". By the end of 2014, only 294 cases had come to trial, although the majority still awaited sentencing. Meanwhile, studies of Colombian universities carried out between 2004 and 2014 reflected that cases of "false positives" had increased 154% in that period.

== Documentaries ==
Bernal participated in the play Antígonas, Tribunal de Mujeres as an approach to using the performing arts as a form of demanding justice. She later participated in various documentaries and audiovisual works to increase visibility of the work of Mothers of Soacha.

In 2014, Oxfam Intermón produced an audiovisual piece about the Mothers of Soacha in their Avanzadoras program, entitled Huellas que no callan (Footprints That Do Not Remain Silent).

Also in 2014 the Mothers of Soacha turned to film to tell the story of their children, of continuing to look for their remains. In 2015 Bernal was featured in the documentary Mujeres al frente, la ley de las más fuertes (Women at the Front, the Law of the Strongest) by journalist Lula Gómez, where her testimony, along with that of Mayerlis Angarita, Patricia Guerrero, Beatriz Montoya, Luz Marina Becerra, and Vera Grabe, is part of a series of stories that narrate the struggles and resistance of peasant women to survive the internal armed conflict and their responses to the abuses to which rural, black, and indigenous communities have been subjected.

== Recognitions ==
The group Mothers of Soacha has been recognized with various international human rights awards, notably:

- Nominated for the Nobel Peace Prize in 2016
- 2013 Builders of Peace Award, granted by the International Catalan Institute for Peace in the Parliament of Catalonia, Barcelona. It was accepted by Luz Marina Bernal, María Sanabria, and three other members of Mothers of Soacha.
- 2016 Best Leaders Award for seeking truth and justice for the 1,000 to 4,000 victims of the "false positives" in Colombia
