= Líneas Aéreas La Urraca =

Colombian airline (1962–1979)

IATA	ICAO	Call sign
-	-	URRACA
- Founded: 1962
- Ceased operations: 1979
- Hubs: La Vanguardia Airport, El Dorado International Airport
- Headquarters: Villavicencio, Colombia

Líneas Aéreas La Urraca was a Colombian airline.

== History ==
The company was formed in 1962 by brothers Jaramillo Henao for the purpose of providing air transport of supplies to more remote communities of the Eastern Plains and the national territories. His place of business was established in the city Vanguardia airport in Villavicencio. Began operations with 2 Douglas B-18 Bolo, a light bomber converted to a cargo plane. Urraca first Curtiss C-46 were delivered later this year. In 1963, Urraca acquired several Douglas DC-3 to extend their routes to replace these routes were previously operated by Aerotaxi regularly, the subsidiary of Avianca.

In 1970, Urraca acquired three Handley Page Heralds for the new secondary routes recently awarded by the Civil Aviation Authority and which had ceased to be operated temporarily by TAC. In 1975, Urraca delivered 2 Britten Norman Islander and changed their livery with various colors. In 1979, the airline ceased operations.

== Fleet ==
Aircraft used throughout the years were:

- Curtiss C-46 Commando
- Douglas B-18 Bolo
- Douglas C-47 Skytrain
- Douglas DC-3
- Handley Page Herald
- Britten-Norman Islander
- Vickers Viscount

== Accidents and incidents ==
- On Monday 26 November 1962, a Curtiss C-46A Commando crashed into the Port Henderson Hills of Saint Catherine Jamaica shortly after departing Palisadoes Airport (now Norman Manley International). The aircraft was ferrying 2 engines and parts from Fairbank with scheduled refuelling stops in Miami and Kingston. A fuel tank venting issue delayed the departure. The aircraft hit the brow of the hill whilst in a shallow left bank, scraped along the ground and fell down a precipice catching fire roughly 3 minutes after departure. 2 of the three occupants on board were killed.
- On 20 June 1969, a Douglas DC-3 was hijacked on a domestic flight within Colombia from La Vanguardia Airport, Villavicencio to Monterrey. The aircraft landed in Cuba.
- On 12 February 1970, Douglas C-47 HK-1270 crashed while attempting to return to Villavicencio, an hour an 18 minutes after its departure on a flight to Inírida. Because of an overspeed problem in the number one engine, 55 minutes after takeoff, the pilot announced that he was turning around, and the airplane crashed 23 minutes later. The 10 passengers and four crew were all killed.
- On 21 January 1972, Vickers Viscount HK-1347 crashed at Funza after an explosion on board. All 20 people on board were killed.
