= Soacha Province =

Soacha Province Provincia de Soacha
- Province
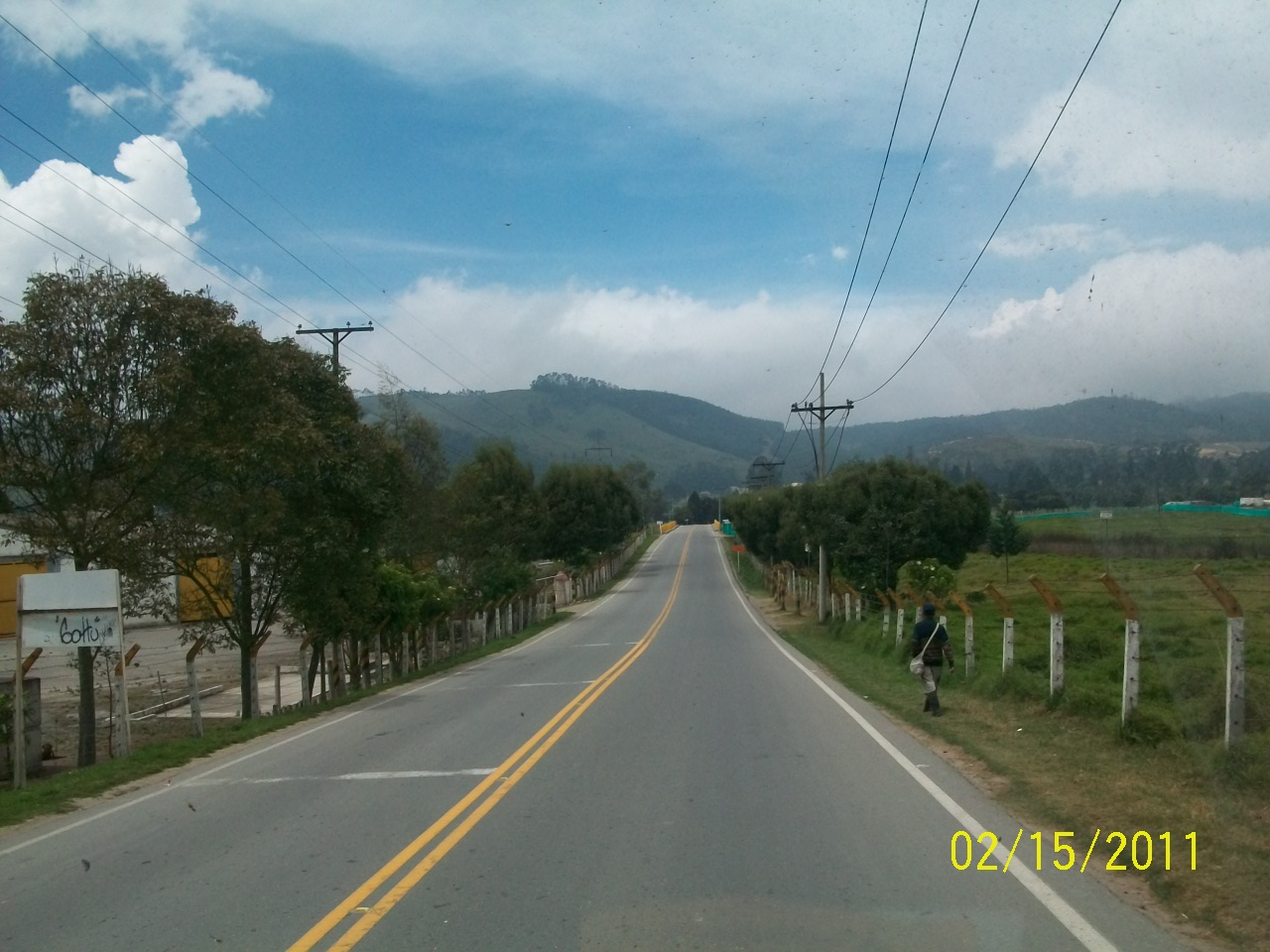
- Road in Soacha
- Etymology: Suá chá; "Man of the Sun"
- Location of Soacha Province in Colombia
- Coordinates: 4°35′14″N 74°13′17″W
- Country: Colombia
- Department: Cundinamarca
- Capital: Soacha
- Municipalities: 2

Area
  - Total: 310.05 km^{2} (119.71 sq mi)

Population (2015)
  - Total: 560,854
  - Density: 1,808.9/km^{2} (4,685.1/sq mi)
- Time zone: UTC−05:00 (COT)
- Indigenous groups: Muisca

Soacha Province is one of the 15 provinces in the Cundinamarca Department, Colombia. Soacha is considered the only borough in the country, and a part of Bogotá, but legally the Colombian Republic considers it a municipality.

== Etymology ==
The name of the province Soacha is derived from the Chibcha words Súa; Sun god Sué and chá, "man"; "Man of the Sun".

== Subdivision ==
Soacha is divided into 2 municipalities:

Municipality bold is capital	Area km^{2}	Elevation (m) urban centre	Population 2015	Founded	Map
Sibaté	125.6	2700	38,412	1967	
Soacha	184.45	2565	522,442	1600	
Total	310.05		560,854		
