= Monterrey, Casanare =

Coordinates: 4.87833°N 72.8972°W

- Municipality and town
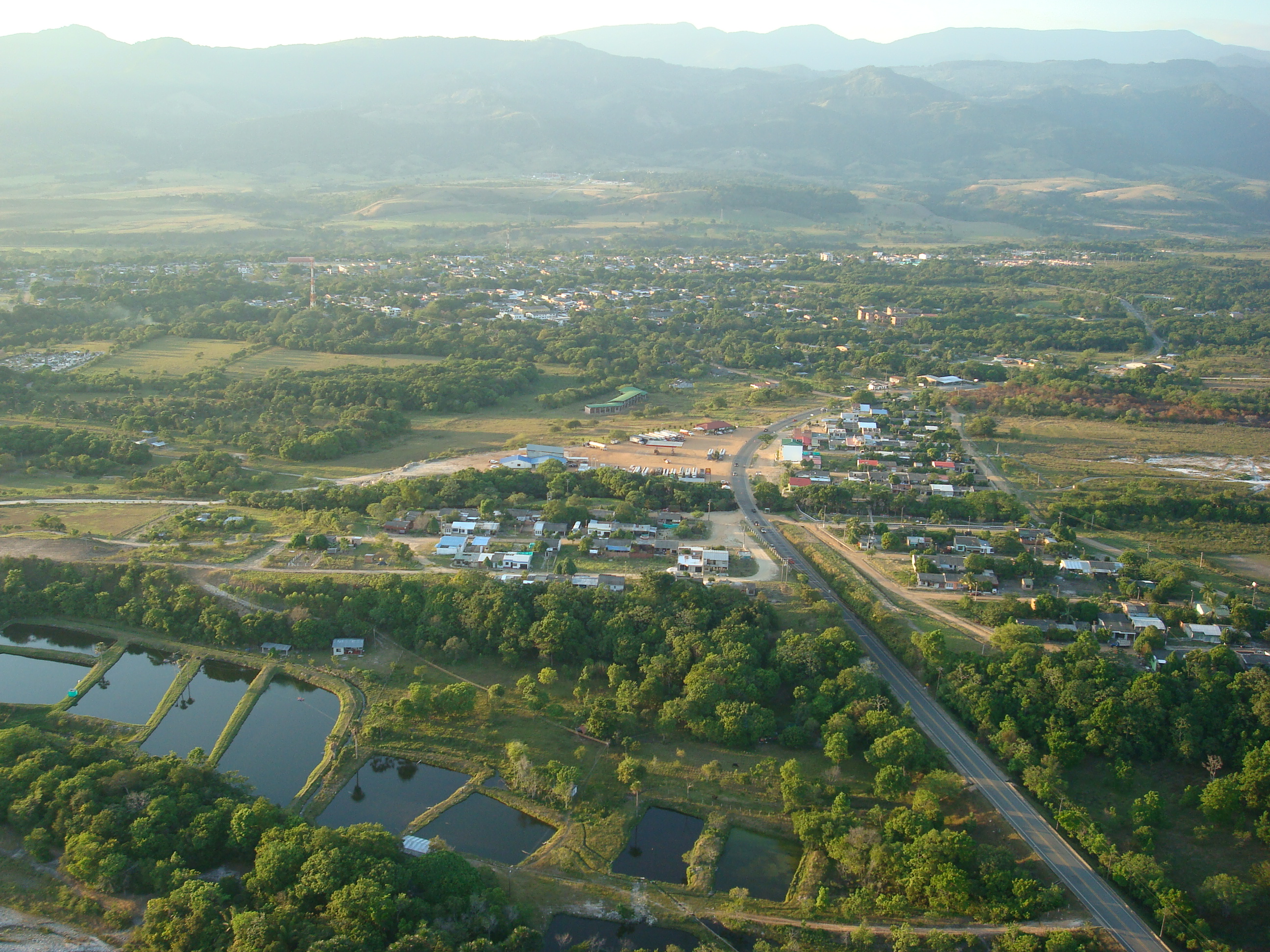
- Panorama of Monterrey

- Flag Coat of arms

- Location of the municipality and town of Monterrey, Casanare in the Casanare Department of Colombia.
- Country: Colombia
- Region: Orinoquía Region
- Department: Casanare Department
- Foundation: 6 September 1953

Government
  - Mayor: Orlando Martinez (2016-2019)

Area
  - Total: 879 km^{2} (339 sq mi)

Population (Census 2018)
  - Total: 14,828
  - Density: 16.9/km^{2} (43.7/sq mi)
- Time zone: UTC-5 (Colombia Standard Time)
- Website: http://www.monterrey-casanare.gov.co/ (Spanish)

Monterrey is a town and municipality in the Department of Casanare, Colombia. It is located approximately 105 kilometers south-west of the city Yopal, the capital of the Casanare department.

The town was founded on 6 September 1953. It was recognized as a municipality in 1960. The town is roughly 879.57 km^{2} and has approximately 14,831 inhabitants.

== History ==
Previous to the Spanish conquest, this area was largely under the influence of the Muisca civilization. The social, cultural and productive organization was the most developed in what is now known as Colombia. The process of conquest began in 1499 and lasted until 1550. Following the conquest, the new government, whose powers were bestowed by Phillip II, subjugated the region and its native peoples.

The administrative existence of Monterrey began as outlined in the Constitution of Cúcuta, which in 1821 divided the country into departments, these into provinces, the provinces into cantons and the latter into parishes. Beginning as a municipality of Boyacá, following the Colombian Civil War and the Constitution of Rionegro of 1863, Boyacá was divided into 6 new departments, and Casanare was recognized for the first time as an independent department of the Orinoquía Region.

== Geography ==
=== Location ===
Located in the foothill's east of the local mountain range Cuchilla Palmichal, Monterrey sits 105 km from Yopal. The town has heights ranging from 300 meters above sea level on the lower banks of the Túa River and the urban centre. The area maintains an average temperature of 25 °C

=== Geomorphology ===
Monterrey possesses varied geological reliefs which offers a diversity of mountain landscapes, piedmont, upland, hills, and valleys.

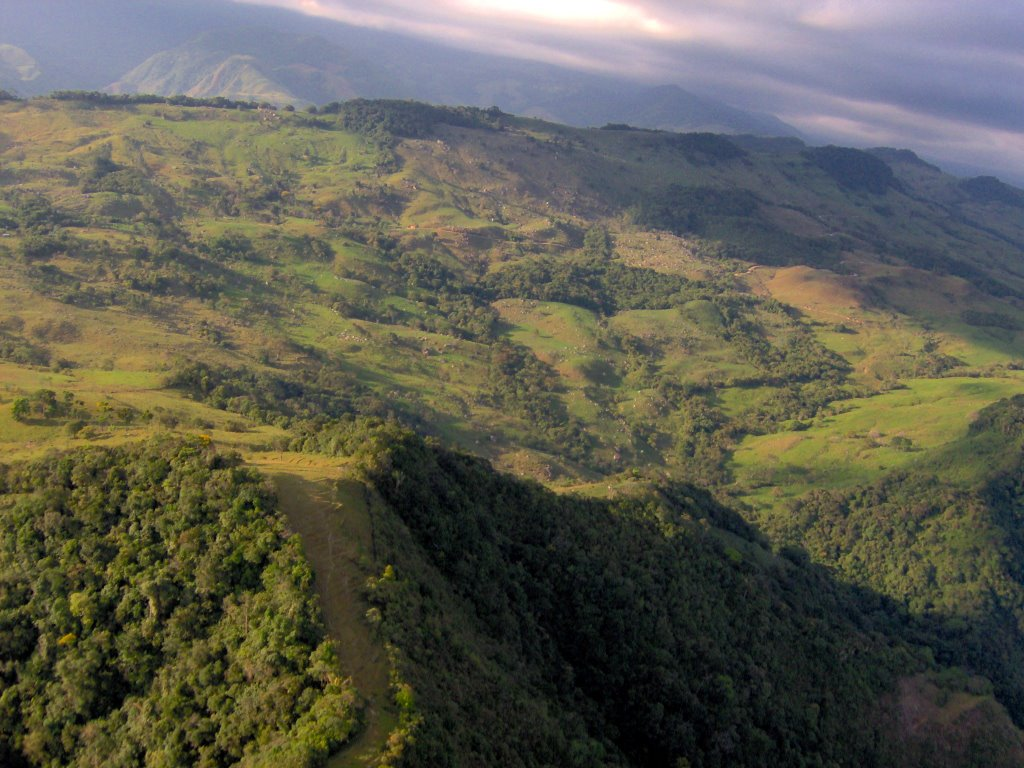
The mountains of Monterrey

=== Mountain landscape ===
The region corresponds to a folded structural system whose height and shape is caused by the action of tectonic forces on a set of sedimentary rocks of different composition, which are being affected by denudative phenomena. The mountains are located on the western side of the municipality. Due to tectonic activity of the region, the topography can be abrupt, with slopes greater than 45%. Heights of the mountains range from 800 to 2000 MASL also due to unstable tectonics. Monterrey is home to many Monoclinal ridges corresponding to elongated forms in the form of asymmetric blades that protrude due to their height within the mountainous system. They are escarpments whose structural slopes are regular due to the uniformity and hardness of the rocks that conform it, corresponding to elongated blades of high slope and edges associated with sandstone.

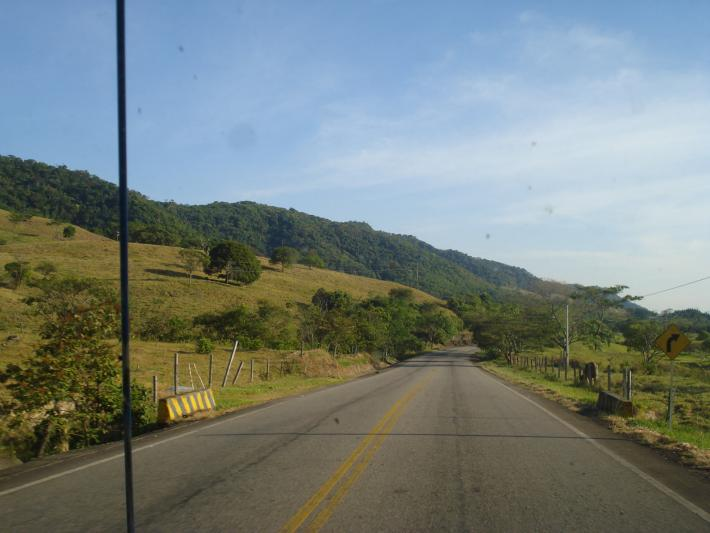
The interdepartmental road.

=== Upper landscape ===
The uplands are located in the southern part of Monterrey and in some small isolated areas in the centre of the urban area, with heights ranging from 300 to 600 MASL. The areas are characterized by flat, geologically recent areas which have been raised and tilted. Diffuse runoff and laminar surface erosion is present. The uplands are surrounded by dissected terraces. The topography is characterized by flat and wavy slopes up to 12%. Its lithology presents surface gravels and ridges which cover the box formation. The drainage is dense, dendritic, or sub-parallel.

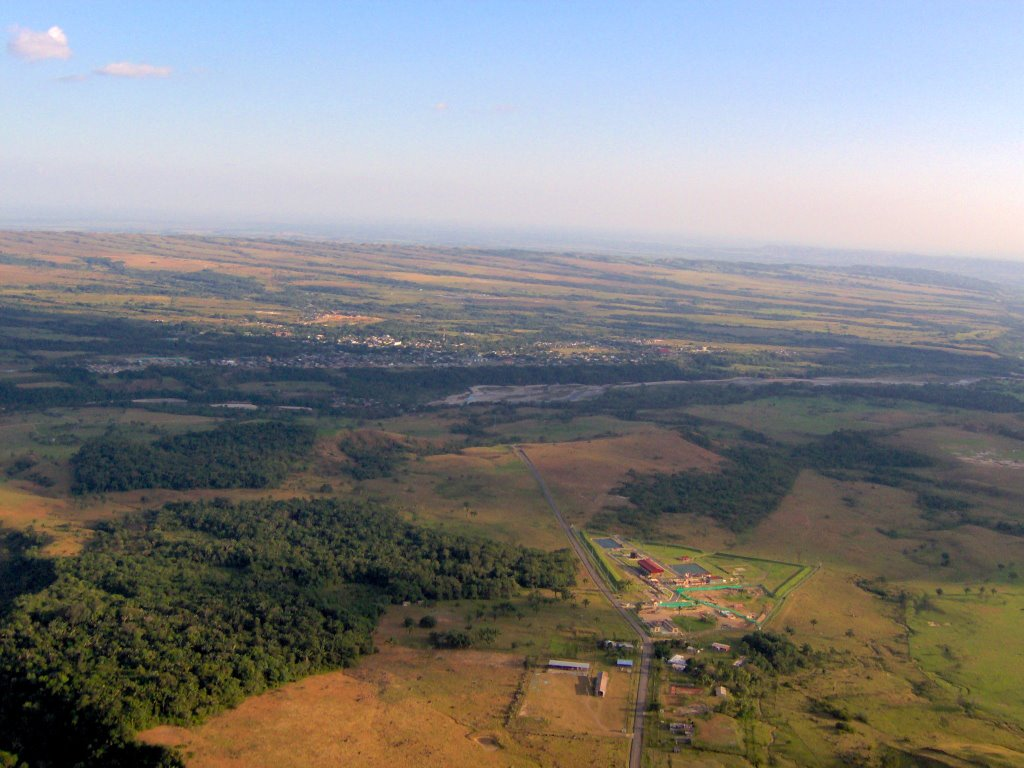
Panorama of Monterrey from the mountains.

=== Plain landscape ===
In Monterrey, the plains are located in two small areas: the Southeast and Northeast. The plains present deposits of sedimentation of fine material, brought in from the rivers originating in the mountainous areas. The plains are largely flat terrain.

== Flora and fauna ==
=== Flora ===
Most of the native vegetation in the municipality has been removed or deforested by its inhabitants. The undergrowth consists of numerous shrubs, woody vines, herbaceous plants and epiphyte. The following vegetation is the most abundant in the area:

- Gallery forests
- Dacryodes
- Tapirira
- Mauritia flexuosa
- Socratea exorrhiza
- Spondias
- Guarea
- Cecropia

=== Wildlife ===
The municipality of Monterrey, like most of the foothills of the Colombian plains has very little wildlife due to extensive hunting and intense human interference over forests and ecosystems, turning natural habitats into pastures and agricultural crops.

=== Birds ===
Monterrey hosts a varied and unique range of aviary life. The most common species of bird in the region are the Roadside hawk. The following species of birds are also found:

- Herons
- Scarlet Ibis
- Crow
- Jay
- Gray Heron
- Tawny
- Parrots
- Hawk
- Woodpecker
- Partridges
- Ruddy ground-dove
- Tyrannus savana
- Yellow Oriole
- Green oropendola
- Blue-gray tanager

=== Mammals ===
The most common are the armadillo, Capybara, Lowland Paca, Deer, Bear, Anteater, Sloth Bear, Bat, Squirrel, Pheasant, Fox, and others.

== Culture and local folklore ==
Monterrey is home to large pockets Llanero and Joropo culture.

The town often engages in Beach bullfighting, and since 1997 a Summer Festival has been held on the beaches of the Túa River. It is customary to carry out activities of beach sports, adventure spots, and horse riding. The festival hosts musical groups from the region, as well as special performances by native folklorists and grand orchestras.

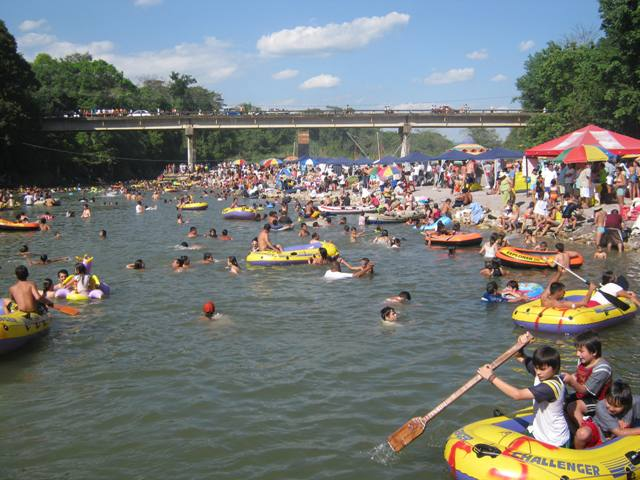
The Summer Festival

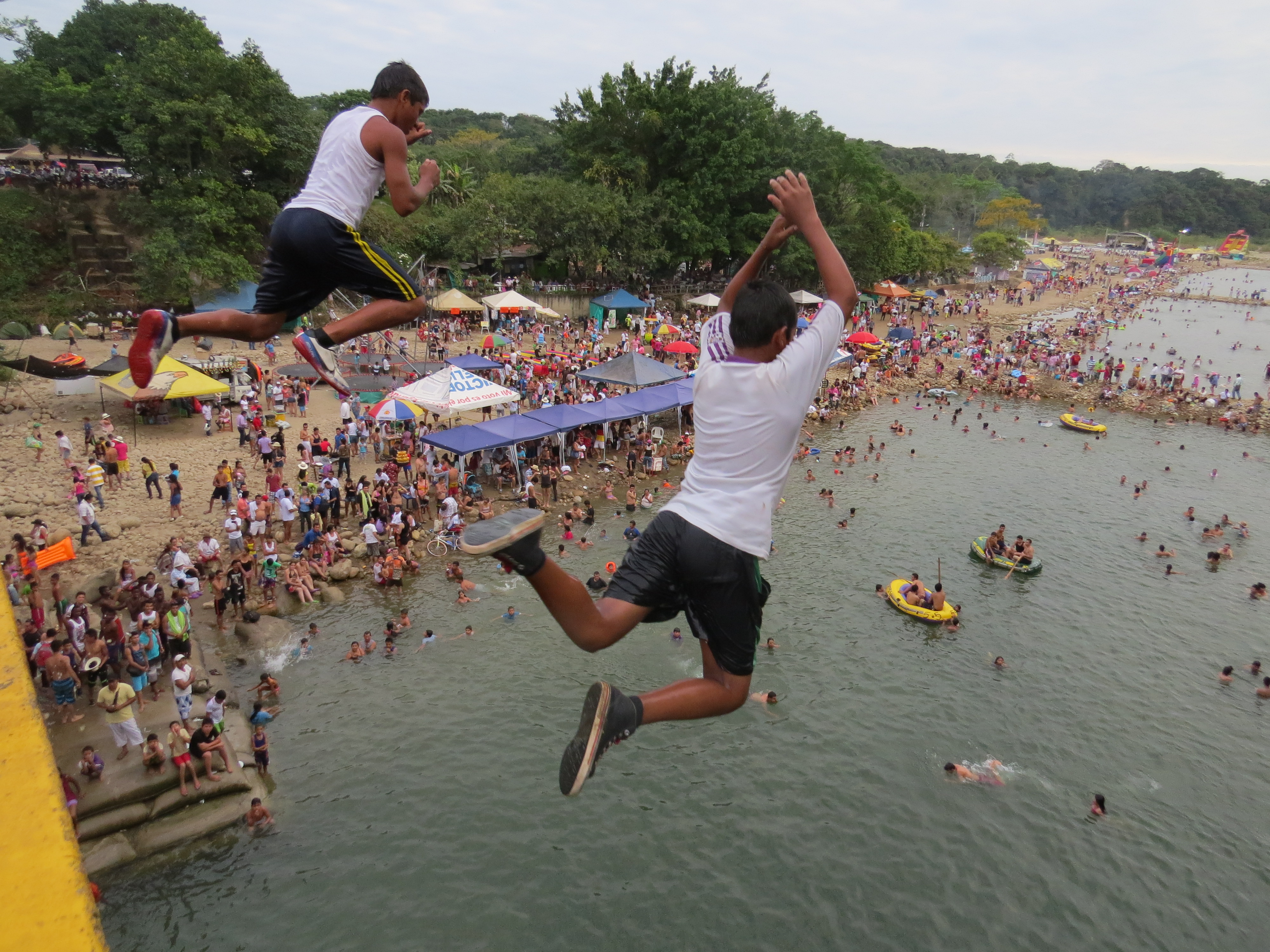
The Summer Festival

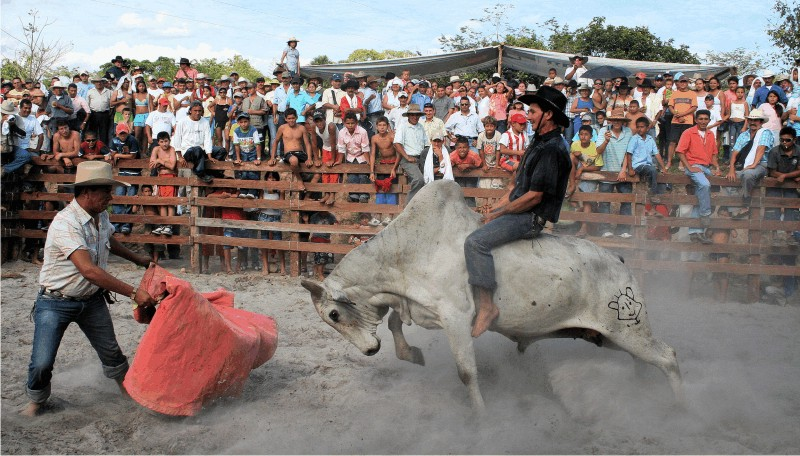
Bullfighting on the beach

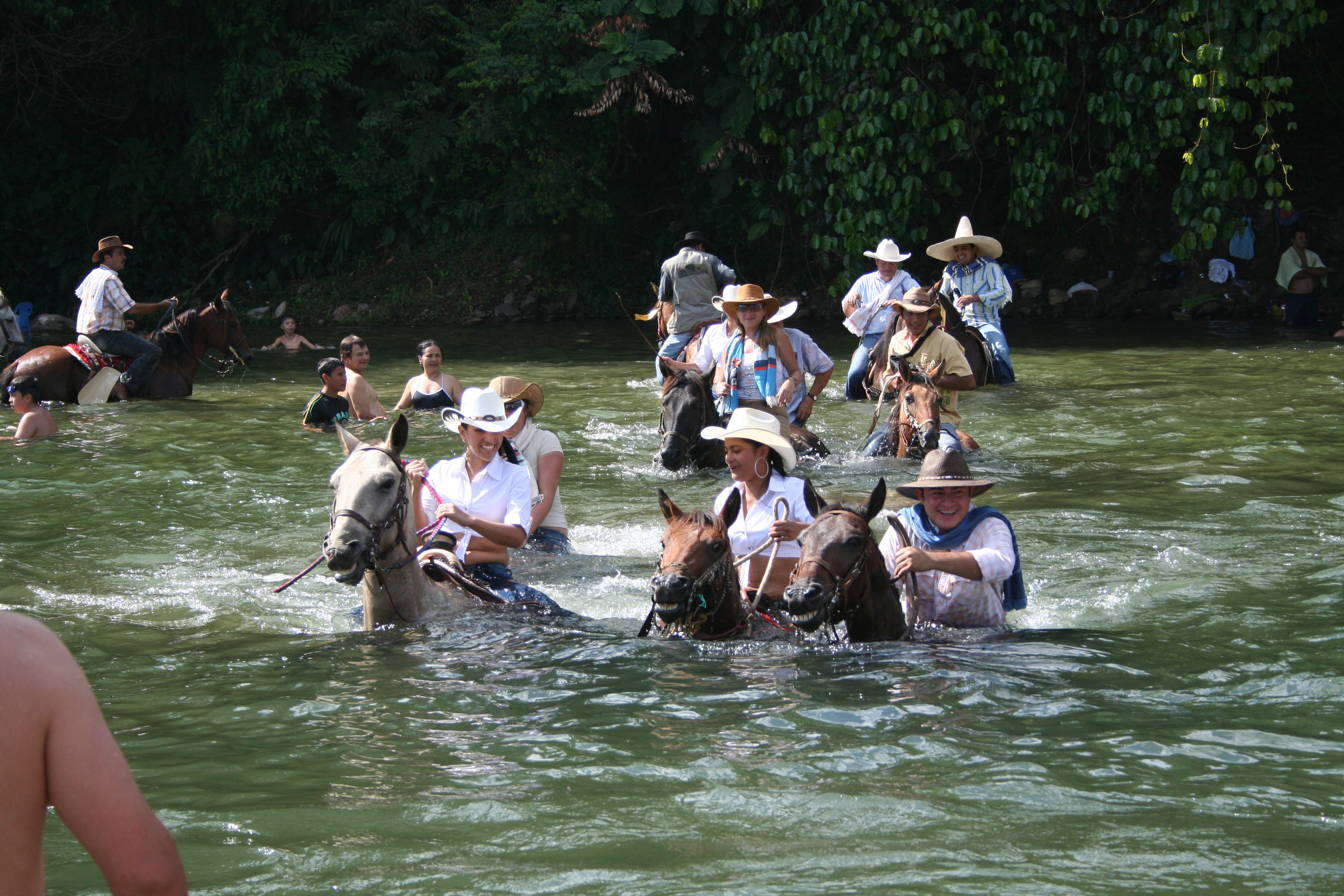
Crossing the river on horseback

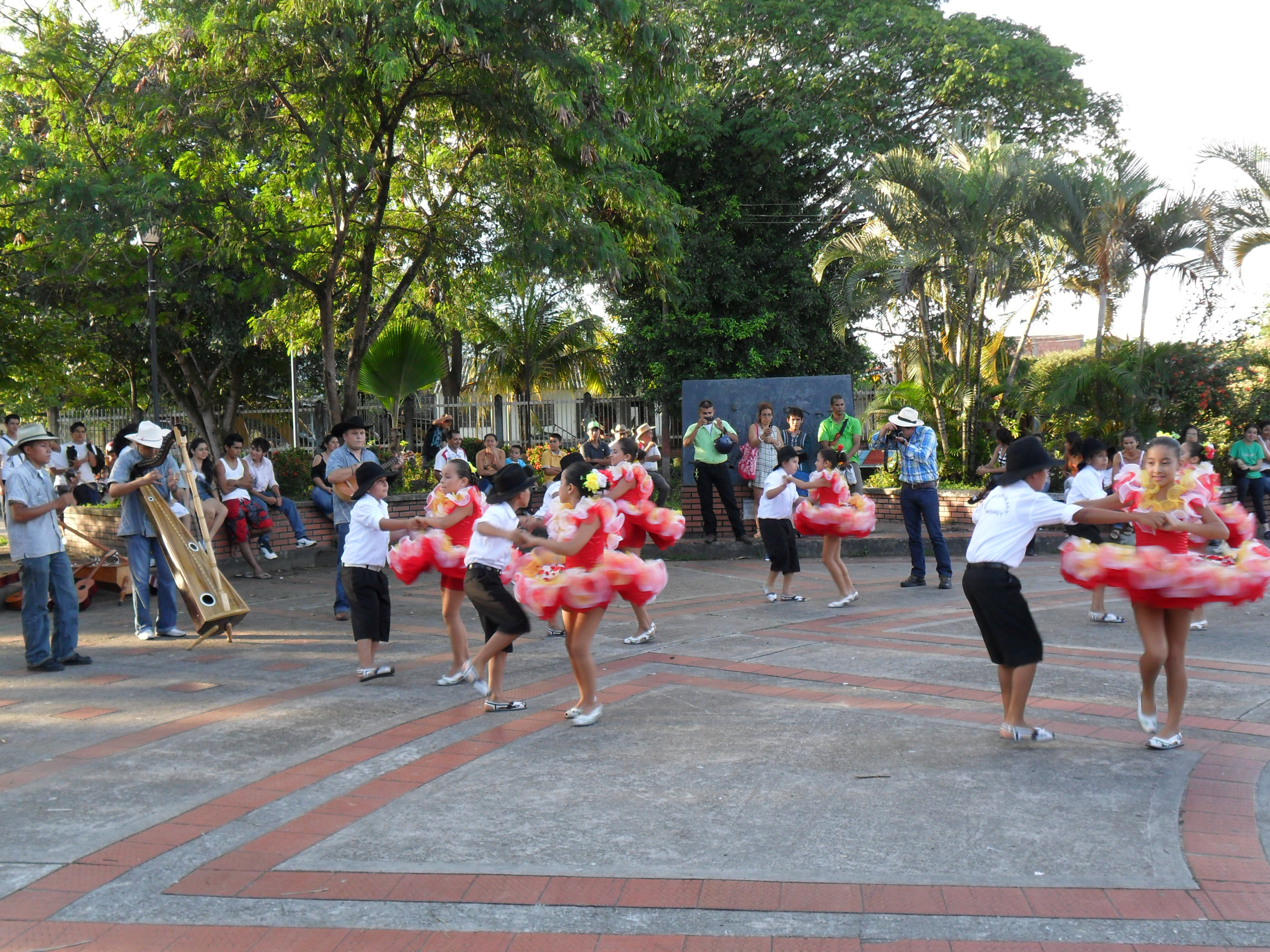
Folklore performance
