= "False positives" scandal =

Murders of civilians in Colombia, 1988–2009

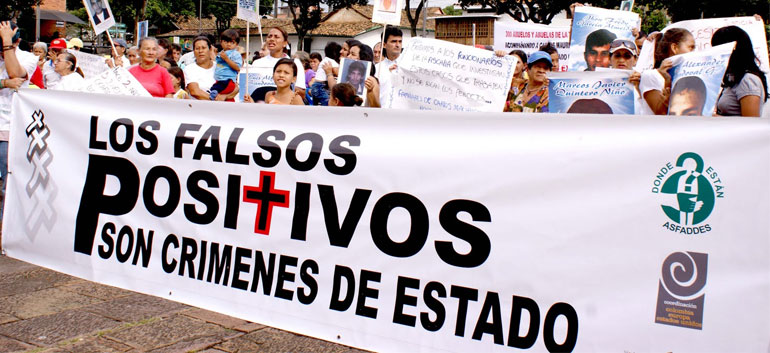
A banner reading (in Spanish) "false positives are state crimes" held up during a protest in 2014

The "false positives" scandal (Spanish: Escándalo de los falsos positivos) was a series of murders in Colombia, part of the armed conflict in that country between the government and guerrilla forces of the FARC and the ELN. Members of the military and their civilian collaborators lured poor or mentally impaired civilians to remote parts of the country with offers of work, killed them, and presented them to authorities as guerrilleros killed in battle, in an effort to inflate body counts and receive promotions or other benefits. While Colombian investigative agencies have found cases as early as 1988, the peak of the phenomenon took place between 2006 and 2009, during the presidency of Álvaro Uribe Vélez.

As of June 2012, a total of 3,350 such cases had been investigated in all parts of the country and verdicts had been reached in 170 cases. Human rights groups have charged that the judicial cases progressed too slowly. The Special Jurisdiction for Peace (JEP) established in a February 2021 report the total number of victims to be 6,402 between 2002 and 2008. The JEP is a special type of court without compulsive participation to any of the actors accused and involved, only those willing are put on the stand. An article from The Guardian shows a 2018 study claiming a total of 10,000 "false positive" victims between 2002 and 2010.

The name of the scandal refers to the technical term of "false positive" which describes a test falsely detecting a condition that is not present. However, in armed conflicts such as this one, it refers to "The victim being lured under false pretenses by a 'recruiter' to a remote location. There, the individual is killed soon after arrival by members of the military. The scene is then manipulated to make it appear as if the individual was legitimately killed in combat."

== 2008 Soacha case ==
As a precedent between August 7, 2002, and August 6, 2004, more than six thousand people were arrested, violating agreements and norms established within human rights. Many of the cases lacked due process. Thus, for this period there were arrests without substantiated evidence, mass arrests that ignored international law amid military operations, and arrests used as a mechanism for political persecution.

The false positives scandal broke out in 2008, when 22 men from Soacha who had been recruited for work were found dead several hundred miles away in Ocaña, and their families demanded explanations from the government. A recruiter later testified that he had received $500 from the Colombian military for each man he recruited and delivered to them. In June 2012, six members of the army were sentenced to long prison sentences in that case.

After the 2008 Soacha discoveries, defense minister Juan Manuel Santos denied knowledge of the scheme, fired 27 officers including three generals and changed the army's body count system. General Mario Montoya, commander of the Colombian Army, resigned on November 4, 2008. President Alvaro Uribe ordered the cases to be handled by civilian courts to ensure impartiality.

According to reports in 2009, both former Defense Minister Santos and ex-President Uribe have claimed that there were cases of false claims, where legitimate killings were presented as "false positives" in order to stain the name of the military and undermine military morale.

== Earlier cases ==
Accusations of similar cases had occurred much earlier. A recently declassified 1990 cable by U.S. Ambassador Thomas McNamara reported on a case involving nine men who were killed by the military, dressed in military fatigues and presented as guerrilleros. Similar extrajudicial executions had been reported throughout the 1990s. In a 2011 magazine article published by CINEP, from the 951 cases reported, at least 730 victims were during Uribe Velez's presidency, with an increase of 50% in his second term (2006–2010), coinciding with the Permanent Ministerial Directive No. 29 of 2005 signed by his Defense Minister at the time, Camilo Ospina Bernal, detailing the parameters of the benefits received from "combat kills".

== UN investigation and report, 2009 ==
In June 2009, UN special rapporteur Philip Alston carried out an investigation of extrajudicial executions in Colombia. He reported:

The victim is lured under false pretenses by a "recruiter" to a remote location. There, the individual is killed soon after arrival by members of the military. The scene is then manipulated to make it appear as if the individual was legitimately killed in combat. The victim is commonly photographed wearing a guerrilla uniform, and holding a gun or grenade. Victims are often buried anonymously in communal graves, and the killers are rewarded for the results they have achieved in the fight against the guerillas. [...]

I interviewed witnesses and survivors who described very similar killings in the departments of Antioquia, Arauca, Valle del Cauca, Casanare, Cesar, Cordoba, Huila, Meta, Norte de Santander, Putumayo, Santander, Sucre, and Vichada. A significant number of military units were thus involved. [...]

Evidence showing victims dressed in camouflage outfits which are neatly pressed, or wearing clean jungle boots which are four sizes too big for them, or lefthanders holding guns in their right hand, or men with a single shot through the back of their necks, further undermines the suggestion that these were guerillas killed in combat. [...]

I have found no evidence to suggest that these killings were carried out as a matter of official Government policy, or that they were directed by, or carried out with the knowledge of, the President or successive Defence Ministers. On the other hand, the explanation favoured by many in Government – that the killings were carried out on a small scale by a few bad apples – is equally unsustainable.

== Trials ==
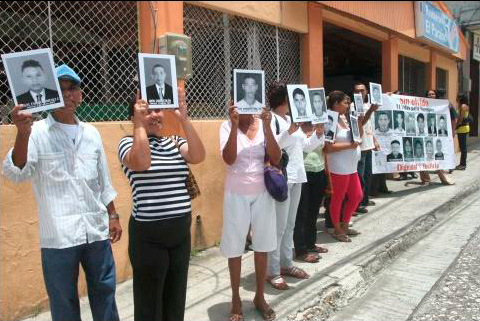
Family members of young people carrying photos and banners before the military trial for the murder of 11 young people from Toluviejo, Sucre

Colombia's Special Jurisdiction for Peace (JEP) charged General Mario Montoya Uribe, as well as two lieutenant colonels, 4 sub-lieutenants, one lieutenant, and an infantry soldier with war crimes and crimes against humanity for lying about combat kills, covering up of excessive use of force, pressuring soldiers under their command to get "combat kills", using violent language to incite violence, among other crimes. The charges involved 130 assassinations and forced disappearances in Medellín, Antioquia between 2002 and 2003.

In 2011, a Colombian army colonel received a sentence of 21 years in prison for his admitted involvement in the killing of two peasants who were then presented as guerrilleros. He also admitted that his unit had carried out 57 similar murders. He claimed that he learned of previous "false positive" killings when he first arrived at his unit, and was warned by Defence Minister Santos to obtain measurable results or lose his position. He later testified at other "false positive" trials. In 2013 a Colombian radio station played a tape on which the colonel is overheard extorting other army members with offers not to testify against them.

== Violence against whistleblowers ==
There were several soldiers who refused to perform these executions, with the most well-known article being that of Corporal Raúl Antonio Carvajal Londoño. He was tortured and murdered on the 8th of August 2006, a few days after a fearful call to his father Don Raúl Carvajal, where he detailed his refusal to execute two innocent young men who were supposed to be labeled as insurgents fallen in combat. After his assassination, his father traveled the country for 15 years, telling his story and demanding justice for his son until he died in 2021 due to complications from COVID-19.

== Developments in the 2010s ==
The International Federation for Human Rights produced a report on the scandal in May 2012, alleging over 3,000 civilian victims between 2002 and 2008. The group asked the Prosecutor of the International Criminal Court prosecutor to open an investigation, as "those who bear the greatest responsibility for these crimes are not being investigated or prosecuted in Colombia."

Former defense minister Santos was elected President of Colombia in 2010; in 2012 he backed legislation that has been criticized by human rights groups because they fear it could potentially revert the "false positive" cases to military courts. He issued an apology to the families of the victims in 2021 for not believing the reports at first, and for his late response to the crisis of the Falsos positivos as Uribe's Minister of Defense.

The text of a 2013 law which regulated and implemented the previous 2012 reform includes extrajudicial executions among a list of crimes which will continue to remain under civilian court jurisdiction and will not be submitted to military courts. Critics have expressed concern that the defense lawyers of military personnel accused in false positive cases may argue that their crimes are not extrajudicial executions (which were previously not defined as a crime in the Colombian penal code) but homicides, as a way to avoid the jurisdiction of civilian courts and request a transfer to military courts. Legislators who supported the bill have argued that another paragraph in the law expressly states that cases of false positives currently in civilian justice cannot be transferred to the military justice system. According to the report of the working group on the arbitrary detention of the United Nations, arbitrary deprivation of liberty has been used in other countries as one of the most common practices to imprison political opponents, religious dissidents or to restrict the freedom of expression, it has been found that these imprisonments are also based on the fight against terrorism.

In August 2016, a peace treaty between the Colombian government and the FARC group was signed. One of the consequences of these accord was the establishment of the Commission for Truth and the JEP, which has served as a major hub for information about all crimes committed during this armed conflict, including false positives.

=== Human Rights Watch report of 2015 and consequences ===
In June 2015, Human Rights Watch presented a report on the scandal. At that point, about 800 people, mostly ordinary soldiers, had been convicted in related cases. The report criticized that the majority of cases had been handled by military courts, in contradiction to a Supreme Court ruling. Military judges had suppressed evidence and manipulated crime scenes and whistleblowers were punished.

According to the report, both commander of the armed forces General Juan Pablo Rodríguez and top army chief General Jaime Lasprilla had formerly headed units that committed extrajudicial killings. In July 2016, President Santos rejected the report's claims that high military commanders had escaped punishment for extrajudicial killings. At the same time, he dismissed General Jaime Alfonso Lasprilla, marine commander Admiral Hernando Wills, and air force commander General Guillermo León.

== Recent cases and events, 2010 to present ==
In December 2019, the Special Jurisdiction for Peace (JEP) carried out a procedure at a cemetery in Dabeiba, Antioquia, where the bodies of young people who were victims of extrajudicial executions between 2006 and 2007 were believed to be buried. A soldier being investigated by the JEP identified the site as a place where his military unit had allegedly left the remains of people reported as guerrillas killed in combat.

== See also ==
- Massacre of El Amparo, a 1988 event where Venezuelan military and police falsely claimed they were attacked by guerillas and killed 14 fishermen
- Apure clashes (2021–2022)
