= Sibaté =

- Municipality and town
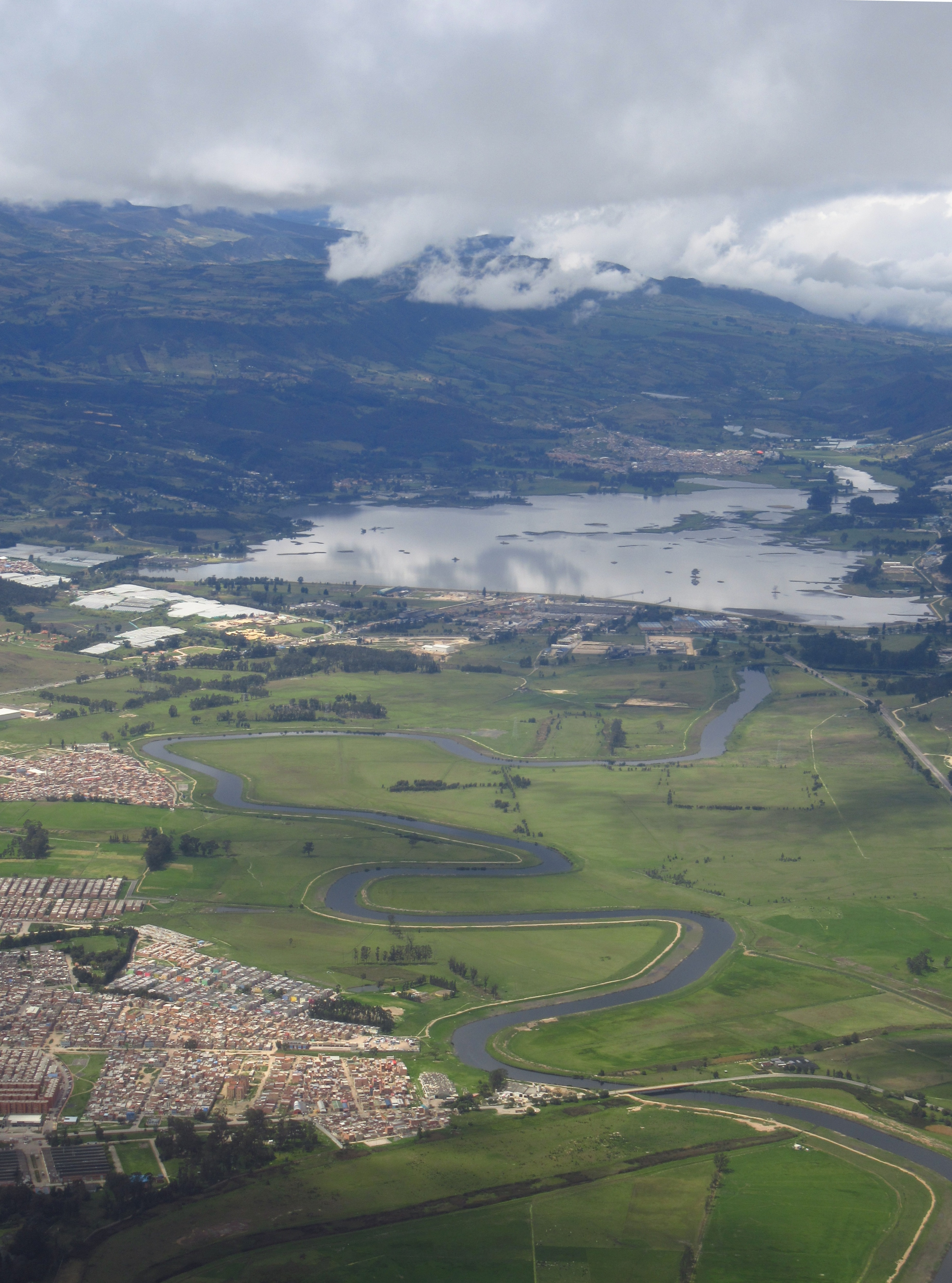

- Flag Coat of arms

- Location of the municipality and town of Sibaté in the Cundinamarca Department of Colombia

- Location in Colombia
- Coordinates: 4°29′27″N 74°15′34″W
- Country: Colombia
- Department: Cundinamarca
- Province: Soacha Province
- Founded: 24 November 1967

Government
  - Mayor: Luis Roberto Gonzalez Peñaloza (2016–2019)

Area
  - Municipality and town: 122.1 km^{2} (47.1 sq mi)
  - Urban: 1.91 km^{2} (0.74 sq mi)
- Elevation: 2,700 m (8,900 ft)

Population (2018 census)
  - Municipality and town: 33,491
  - Density: 274.3/km^{2} (710.4/sq mi)
  - Urban: 23,644
  - Urban density: 12,400/km^{2} (32,100/sq mi)
- Time zone: UTC-5 (Colombia Standard Time)
- Website: Official website

Sibaté (Spanish pronunciation: [siβaˈte]) is a municipality and town of Colombia in the Soacha Province, part of the department of Cundinamarca. Sibaté is located on the Bogotá savanna with the urban centre at an altitude of 2,700 metres (8,900 ft) and a distance of 27 kilometres (17 mi) from the capital Bogotá. It forms part of the metropolitan area of the capital. Sibaté borders Soacha in the north, Pasca and Fusagasugá in the south, Soacha in the east and Silvania and Granada in the west.

== Etymology ==
Sibaté means in Chibcha "Leak of the lake", according to scholar Miguel Triana.

== History ==
In the times before the Spanish conquest, the area of Sibaté was inhabited by the Muisca. The Bogotá savanna was ruled by the zipa based in Bacatá.

Modern Sibaté was founded on November 24, 1967.

== Economy ==
Main economical activities of Sibaté are agriculture (potatoes, peas and strawberries) and livestock farming.

== Notable people ==
- Mayra Ramírez (born 1999), footballer for the Colombia national team

== Climate ==
Climate data for Sibaté (Muna), elevation 2,565 m (8,415 ft), (1971–2000)
Month	Jan	Feb	Mar	Apr	May	Jun	Jul	Aug	Sep	Oct	Nov	Dec	Year
Mean daily maximum °C (°F)	18.4 (65.1)	18.5 (65.3)	18.4 (65.1)	18.4 (65.1)	18.4 (65.1)	18.1 (64.6)	18.1 (64.6)	18.2 (64.8)	18.3 (64.9)	18.0 (64.4)	18.1 (64.6)	18.1 (64.6)	18.2 (64.8)
Daily mean °C (°F)	12.4 (54.3)	12.8 (55.0)	12.9 (55.2)	13.2 (55.8)	13.3 (55.9)	13.1 (55.6)	12.9 (55.2)	13.0 (55.4)	12.9 (55.2)	12.8 (55.0)	12.8 (55.0)	12.5 (54.5)	12.9 (55.2)
Mean daily minimum °C (°F)	6.8 (44.2)	7.4 (45.3)	8.1 (46.6)	8.6 (47.5)	8.9 (48.0)	8.7 (47.7)	8.4 (47.1)	8.1 (46.6)	7.8 (46.0)	8.3 (46.9)	8.2 (46.8)	7.2 (45.0)	8.0 (46.4)
Average precipitation mm (inches)	18.7 (0.74)	26.1 (1.03)	49.5 (1.95)	74.9 (2.95)	70.3 (2.77)	45.2 (1.78)	23.5 (0.93)	36.7 (1.44)	47.7 (1.88)	73.5 (2.89)	63.9 (2.52)	34.8 (1.37)	564.8 (22.24)
Average precipitation days	7	9	12	15	15	14	12	14	13	17	15	10	153
Average relative humidity (%)	81	82	80	83	81	78	75	79	80	84	85	83	81
Mean monthly sunshine hours	164.3	135.7	130.2	111.0	120.9	138.0	164.3	148.8	123.0	111.6	126.0	148.8	1,622.6
Mean daily sunshine hours	5.3	4.8	4.2	3.7	3.9	4.6	5.3	4.8	4.1	3.6	4.2	4.8	4.4
Source: Instituto de Hidrologia Meteorologia y Estudios Ambientales
