= Granada, Cundinamarca =

Granada
- Municipality and town
- Flag Coat of arms

- Location of the municipality and town inside Cundinamarca Department of Colombia

- Location in Colombia
- Coordinates: 4°31′7″N 74°21′5″W
- Country: Colombia
- Department: Cundinamarca
- Elevation: 2,450 m (8,040 ft)
- Time zone: UTC-5 (Colombia Standard Time)

Granada is a Colombian town and municipality in the Cundinamarca Department.
