= Soacha =

- Municipality
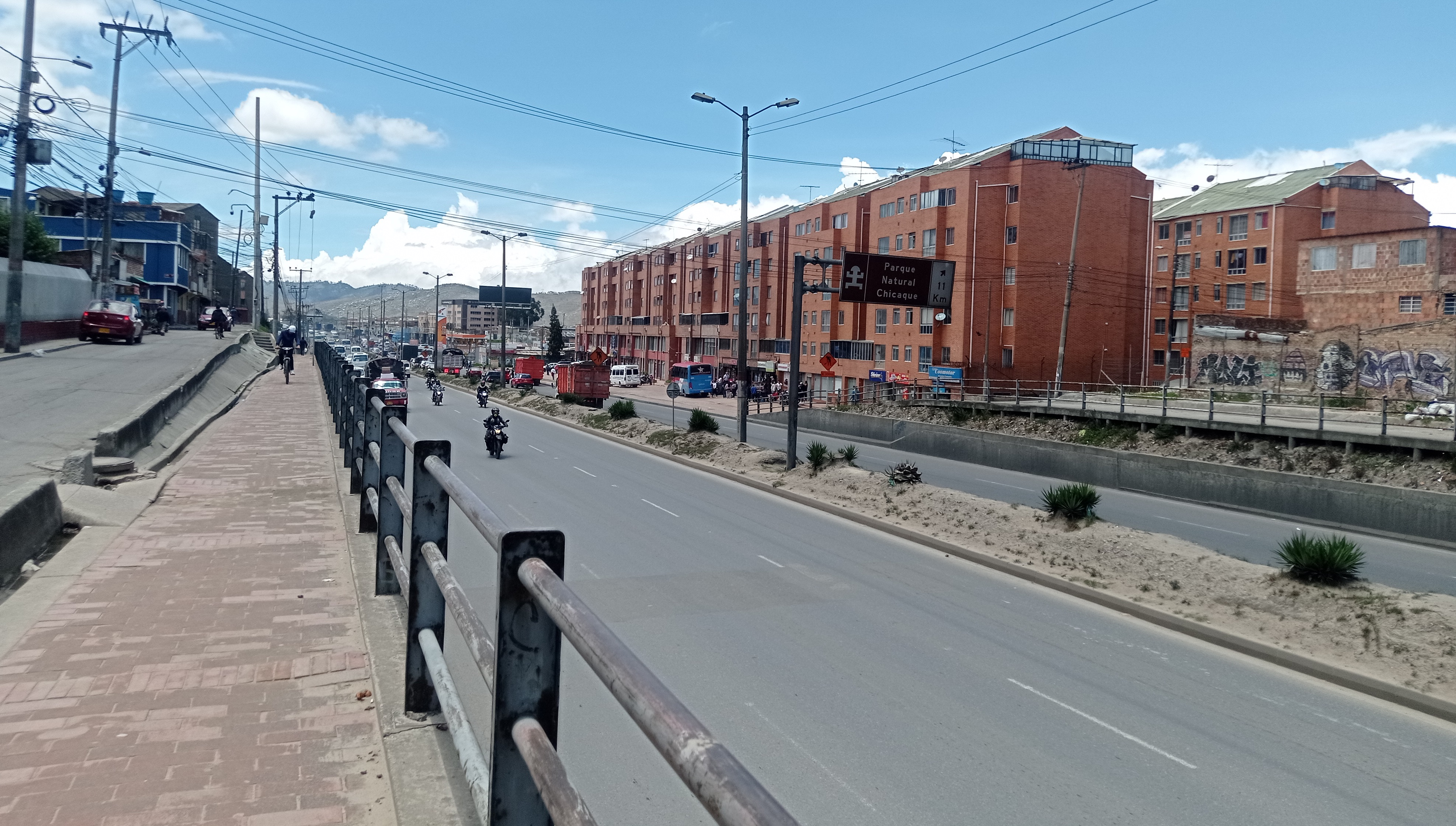
- Bike path in Soacha

- Flag Coat of arms
- Motto: Latin: Sol omnibus lucet (The sun shines equally over everyone)
- Location of Soacha in Cundinamarca

- Location within Colombia
- Coordinates: 04°35′14″N 74°13′17″W
- Country: Colombia
- Department: Cundinamarca
- Province: Soacha
- Founded: 15 August 1600
- Founder: Luis Enríquez

Government
  - Type: Municipality
  - Mayor: Juan Carlos Saldarriaga Gaviria (2016-2019)

Area
  - Municipality: 187.4 km^{2} (72.4 sq mi)
  - Urban: 31.48 km^{2} (12.15 sq mi)
- Elevation: 2,565 m (8,415 ft)

Population (2020)
  - Municipality: 715,252
  - Estimate (2026): 895,878
  - Density: 3,817/km^{2} (9,885/sq mi)
  - Urban: 778,400
  - Urban density: 24,730/km^{2} (64,040/sq mi)
- Demonym: Suachuno
- Area code: 57 + 1
- Website: Official website

Soacha is an autonomous municipality of the department of Cundinamarca in Colombia, and part of the Metropolitan Area of Bogotá. It has an important industrial zone and is home to mostly working-class families. Soacha borders Bojacá and Mosquera to the north, Sibaté and Pasca to the south, to the east the capital Bogotá and to the west Granada and San Antonio del Tequendama.

== Demographics ==
With a population of 778,400 (2023 projection), it is the biggest city in Cundinamarca and one of the biggest in Colombia.

== Etymology ==
The name Soacha is derived from the Chibcha words Súa, name of Sun god Sué, and chá which means "man"; "Man of the Sun". The original name Suecha has been changed to Soacha over time.

== History ==
Soacha was inhabited first by indigenous groups during the Herrera Period and later became an important village in the Muisca Confederation, the former country of the Muisca before the arrival of the Spanish conquistadors. The zipa of Bacatá (now known as Bogotá) ruled over Soacha.

Modern Soacha was founded on 15 August 1600. It gained national notoriety after the presidential candidate Luis Carlos Galán was assassinated on August 18, 1989, while visiting the city during his presidential campaign.

Also during 1989, the bombing of Avianca Flight 203 happened in Soacha, killing everyone on-board plus three Soacha residents. The bombing was planned by Cartel de Medellin leader Pablo Escobar, who intended to murder presidential candidate César Gaviria, who was supposed to be on board. Gaviria had decided not to fly and instead went on to become President of Colombia.

In 2008, the 'false positives' scandal broke when 22 men from Soacha who had been recruited for work were found dead several hundreds of miles away. They had been killed by the military and presented to authorities as guerrilla fighters (insurgents) killed in battle, in order to increase action head counts. Similar cases have since appeared all over the country.

=== Modern development ===
Ciudad Verde is a development project for the lower middle class (estrato 3) residents of Soacha with housing, parks and playgrounds. The project started in 2010 and is scheduled to be finished at the end of 2016.

== Food ==
Soacha has a specific neighborhood name Soacha Parque and it is the most important place that most of the people that go to Bogota have to go. In Soacha Parque their specialty are different kind of traditional desserts, some of them are almojabanas and buñuelos, they are some kind of bread. Also, Soacha is famous because of the arequipe that is dulce de leche but arequipe is home version.

There is the largest logistics center in the coffee world.

== Born in Soacha ==
- Daniel Martínez (cyclist), professional cyclist
- Luz Marina Bernal (born 1960), peace and human rights activist, founder of the Mothers of Soacha
- Walter Pedraza, professional cyclist

== Arts and Culture ==
=== Films ===
Netflix Triple Frontier

== Climate ==
Climate data for Soacha (San Jorge Gja), elevation 2,900 m (9,500 ft), (1981–2010)
Month	Jan	Feb	Mar	Apr	May	Jun	Jul	Aug	Sep	Oct	Nov	Dec	Year
Mean daily maximum °C (°F)	16.6 (61.9)	17.0 (62.6)	16.7 (62.1)	16.1 (61.0)	16.4 (61.5)	15.8 (60.4)	15.3 (59.5)	15.6 (60.1)	16.1 (61.0)	16.1 (61.0)	16.1 (61.0)	16.4 (61.5)	16.1 (61.0)
Daily mean °C (°F)	11.7 (53.1)	11.8 (53.2)	11.9 (53.4)	12.0 (53.6)	11.9 (53.4)	11.7 (53.1)	11.4 (52.5)	11.5 (52.7)	11.7 (53.1)	11.7 (53.1)	11.8 (53.2)	11.8 (53.2)	11.7 (53.1)
Mean daily minimum °C (°F)	6.3 (43.3)	6.7 (44.1)	7.0 (44.6)	7.6 (45.7)	7.5 (45.5)	7.2 (45.0)	7.1 (44.8)	7.2 (45.0)	6.8 (44.2)	7.0 (44.6)	7.0 (44.6)	6.7 (44.1)	7.0 (44.6)
Average precipitation mm (inches)	23.1 (0.91)	38.8 (1.53)	61.8 (2.43)	93.8 (3.69)	98.1 (3.86)	70.1 (2.76)	63.4 (2.50)	48.9 (1.93)	52.8 (2.08)	98.2 (3.87)	86.1 (3.39)	42.8 (1.69)	778 (30.6)
Average precipitation days	7	9	12	16	19	19	21	18	13	17	15	10	171
Mean monthly sunshine hours	167.4	144.0	133.3	117.0	133.3	144.0	164.3	164.3	150.0	130.2	123.0	155.0	1,725.8
Mean daily sunshine hours	5.4	5.1	4.3	3.9	4.3	4.8	5.3	5.3	5.0	4.2	4.1	5.0	4.7
Source: Instituto de Hidrologia Meteorologia y Estudios Ambientales

== Gallery ==
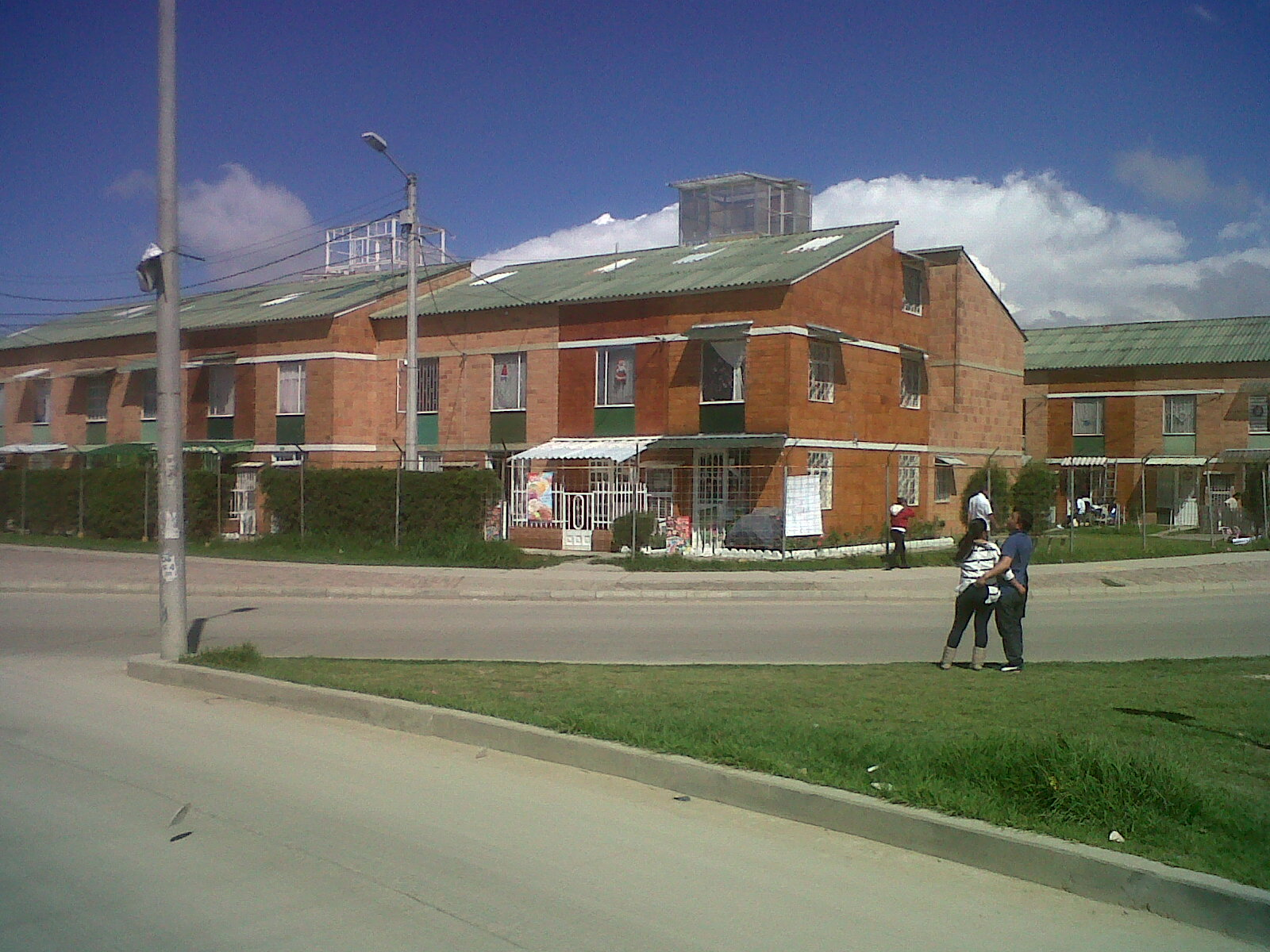
Houses in Soacha

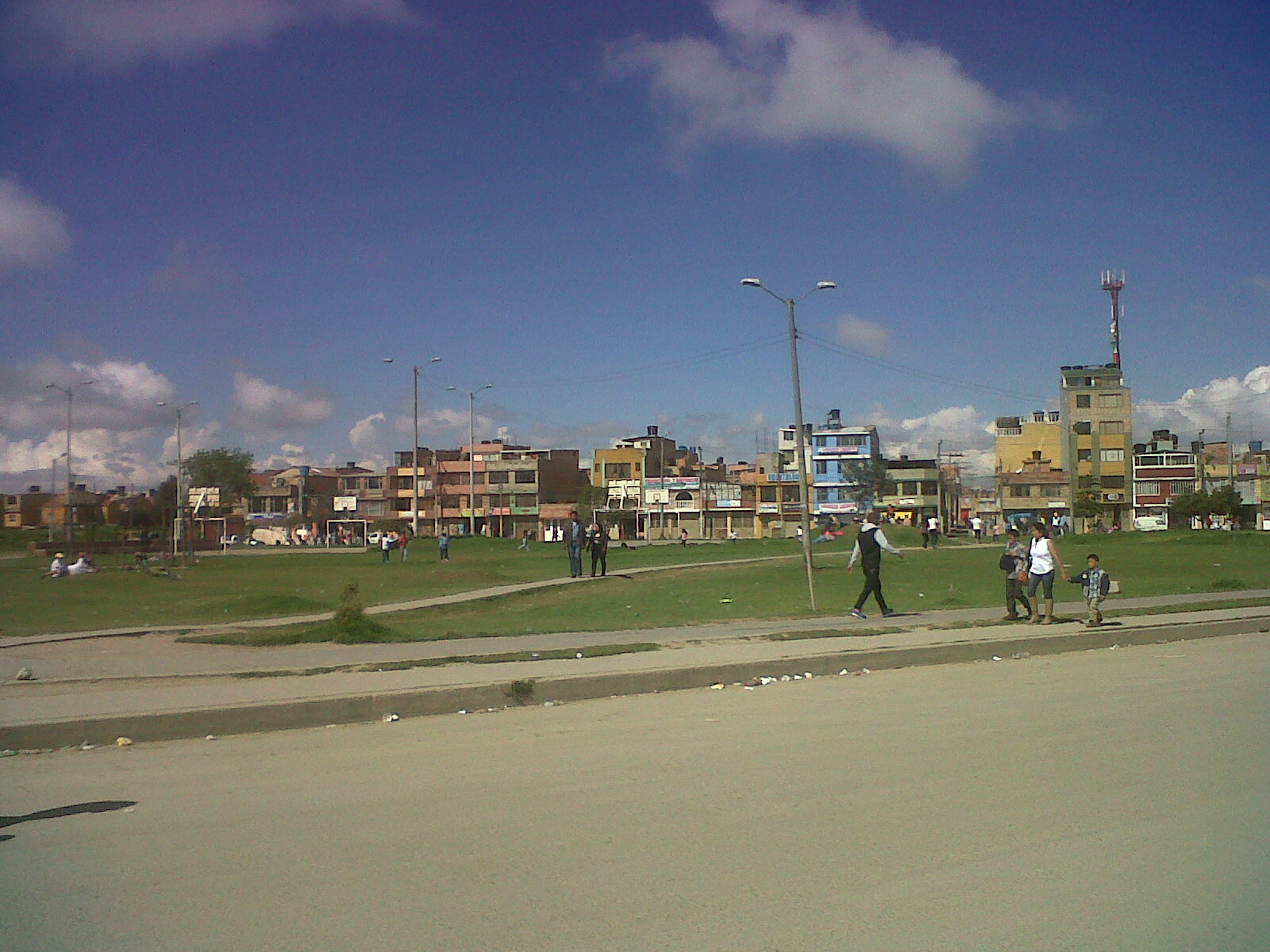
Rincón de Santa Fe park

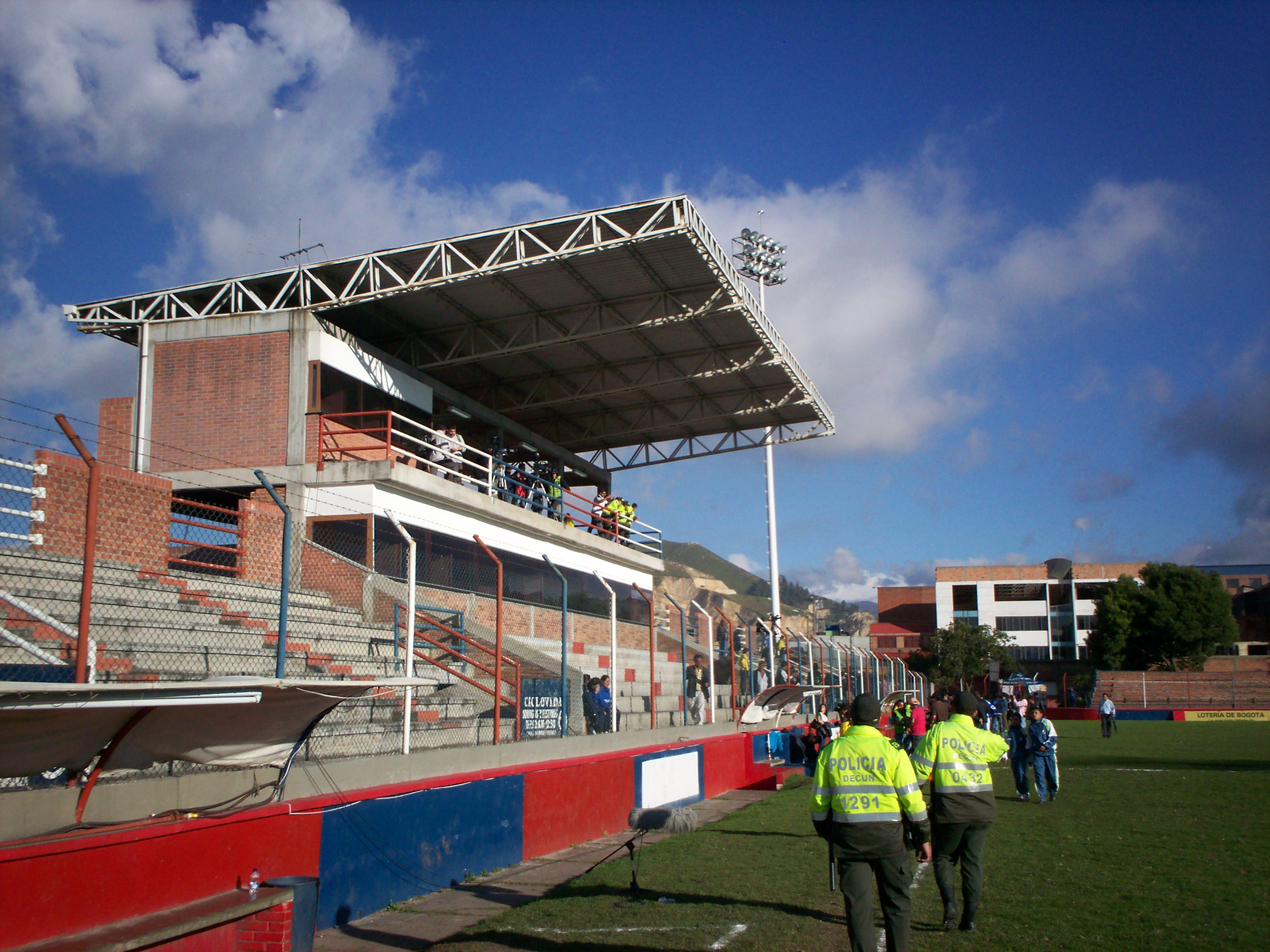
Luis Carlos Galán Stadium
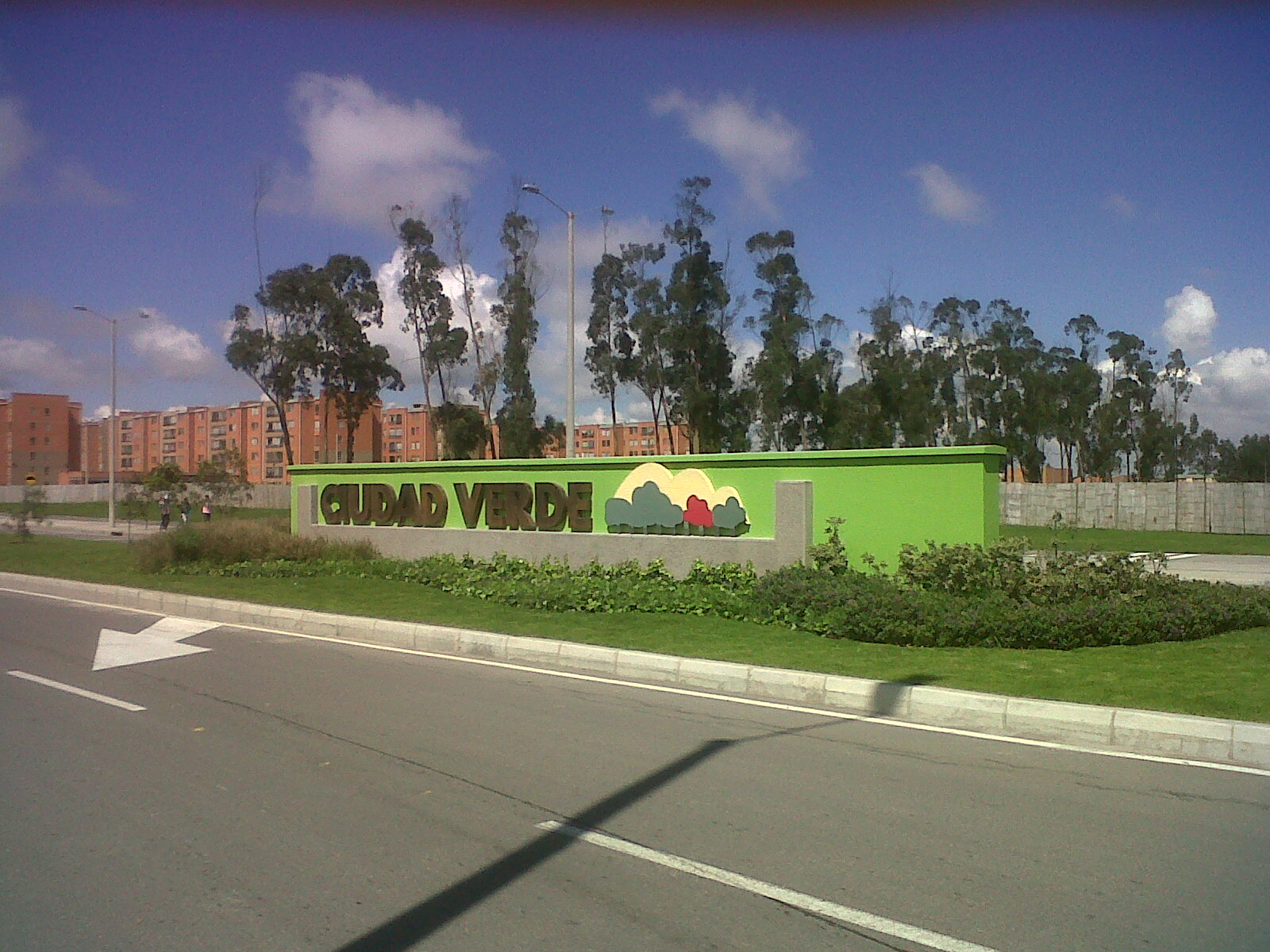
Entrance to Ciudad Verde

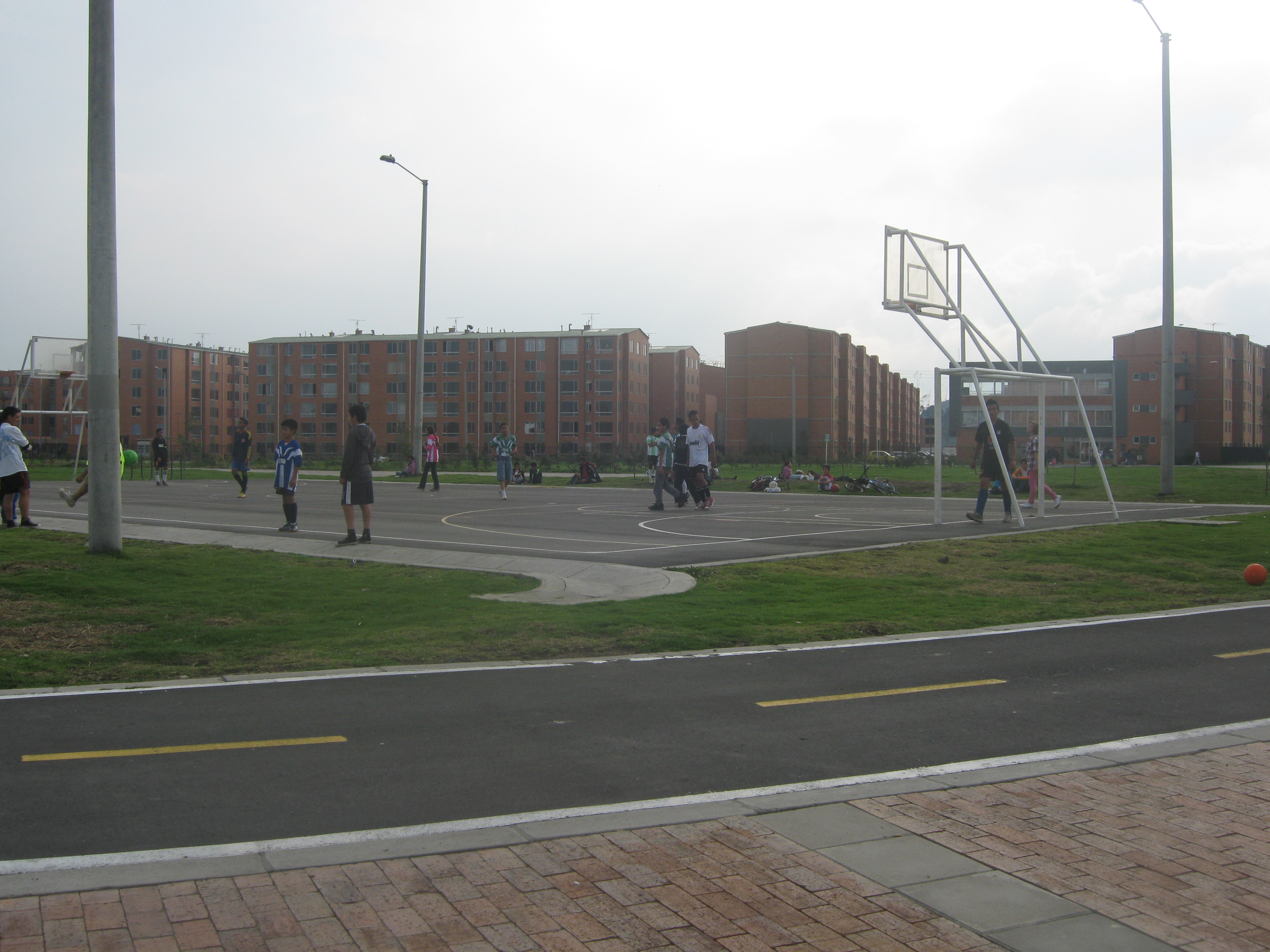
Logroño Park
Ciudad Verde

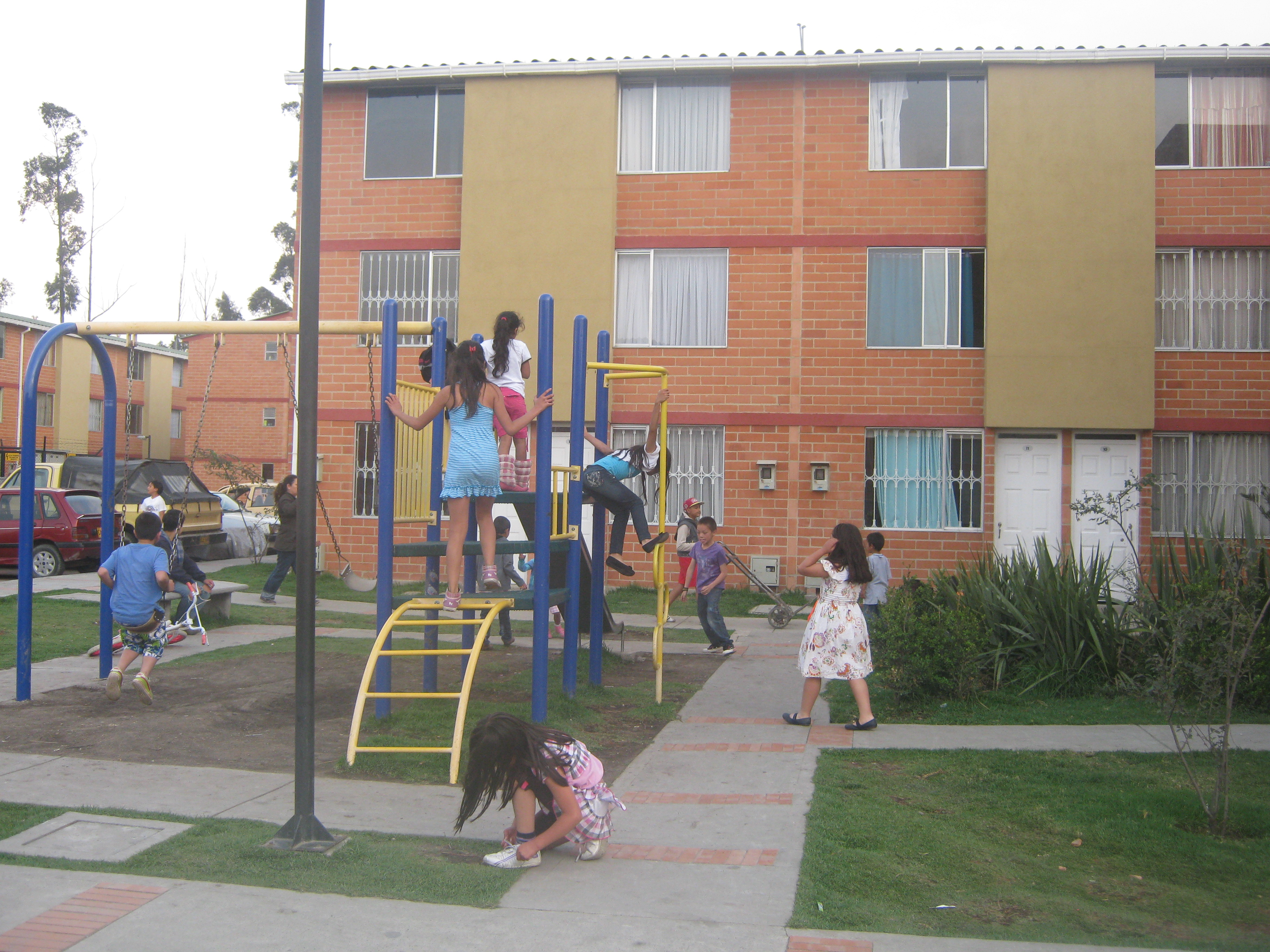
Housing and playground Ciudad Verde
