= Funza =

Funza Muyquytá
- Municipality and town
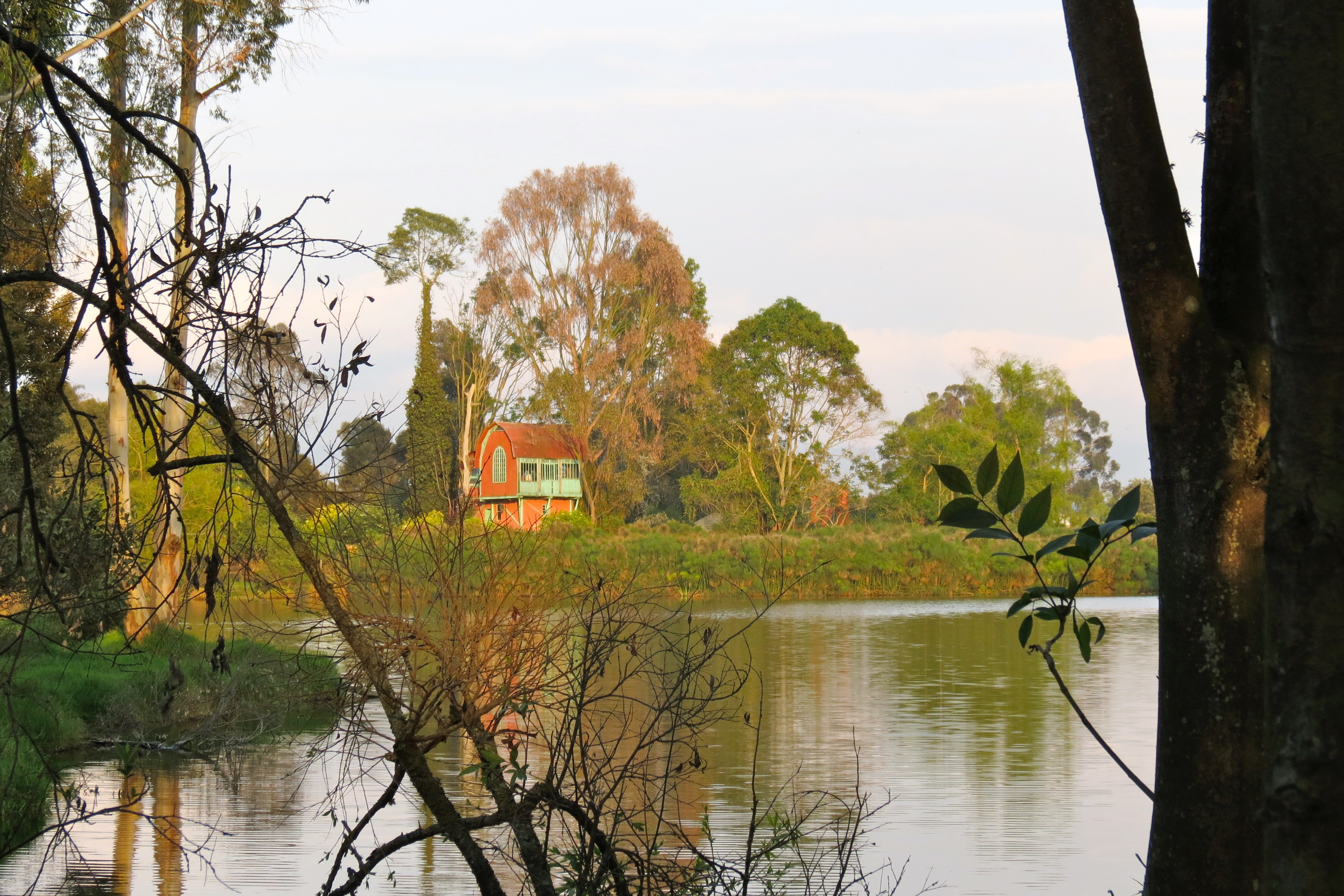
- Wetland in Funza

- Flag Coat of arms

- Location of the municipality and town of Funza in the Cundinamarca Department of Colombia

- Location in Colombia
- Coordinates: 4°43′3″N 74°12′34″W
- Country: Colombia
- Department: Cundinamarca
- Province: Western Savanna
- Founded: 20 April 1537
- Founder: Gonzalo Jiménez de Quesada

Government
  - Mayor: Jeimmy Villamil Buitrago (2024-2027)

Area
  - Municipality and town: 67.75 km^{2} (26.16 sq mi)
  - Urban: 7.78 km^{2} (3.00 sq mi)
- Elevation: 2,548 m (8,360 ft)

Population (2018 census)
  - Municipality and town: 93,154
  - Density: 1,375/km^{2} (3,561/sq mi)
  - Urban: 90,671
  - Urban density: 11,700/km^{2} (30,200/sq mi)
- Demonym: Funzano
- Time zone: UTC-5 (Colombia Standard Time)
- Area code: +1
- Website: Official website

Funza (Spanish pronunciation: [ˈfunsa]) is a municipality and town of Colombia in the Western Savanna Province, of the department of Cundinamarca. Funza is situated on the Bogotá savanna, the southwestern part of the Altiplano Cundiboyacense with the urban centre at an altitude of 2,548 metres (8,360 ft). In Funza the La Florida wetland, part of the wetlands of Bogotá, a remnant of the Pleistocene Lake Humboldt, still exists. The town is part of the Metropolitan Area of Bogotá and borders Madrid and Tenjo in the north, Mosquera in the south, Madrid in the west and Cota and the locality Engativá of the capital Bogotá in the east. The eastern boundary is formed by the Bogotá River. Funza is the site of the former main settlement Bacatá of the Muisca Confederation. Modern Funza was founded by Gonzalo Jiménez de Quesada during the Spanish conquest of the Muisca on April 20, 1537.

== Etymology ==
The name Funza comes from Chibcha and means "Powerful lord".

== History ==
In the times before the Spanish conquest, Funza was an important village in the Muisca Confederation. This loose confederation of rulers of the Muisca had a southern ruler, the zipa based in Bacatá, the present-day municipality of Funza.

Modern Funza was founded by conquistador Gonzalo Jiménez de Quesada en route in his search for El Dorado on April 20, 1537.

On January 21, 1972, a Líneas Aéreas La Urraca flight crashed in Funza after an explosion on board.

== Economy ==
The economy of Funza is based on agricultural and industrial activities. Main agricultural products are potatoes and maize. Other industries involve plastics and metalcraft production.

== Climate ==
Climate data for Funza (Ramada La), elevation 2,545 m (8,350 ft), (1981–2010)
Month	Jan	Feb	Mar	Apr	May	Jun	Jul	Aug	Sep	Oct	Nov	Dec	Year
Mean daily maximum °C (°F)	21.4 (70.5)	20.7 (69.3)	21.1 (70.0)	21.0 (69.8)	20.6 (69.1)	19.7 (67.5)	19.3 (66.7)	19.6 (67.3)	20.1 (68.2)	20.6 (69.1)	20.8 (69.4)	21.5 (70.7)	20.5 (68.9)
Daily mean °C (°F)	14.1 (57.4)	14.1 (57.4)	14.6 (58.3)	14.9 (58.8)	14.9 (58.8)	14.5 (58.1)	14.0 (57.2)	14.0 (57.2)	14.2 (57.6)	14.5 (58.1)	14.7 (58.5)	14.4 (57.9)	14.4 (57.9)
Mean daily minimum °C (°F)	7.8 (46.0)	8.0 (46.4)	8.8 (47.8)	10.0 (50.0)	10.4 (50.7)	9.6 (49.3)	9.3 (48.7)	9.0 (48.2)	8.8 (47.8)	9.6 (49.3)	9.5 (49.1)	8.1 (46.6)	9.1 (48.4)
Average precipitation mm (inches)	26.6 (1.05)	36.9 (1.45)	56.3 (2.22)	96.3 (3.79)	89.4 (3.52)	54.8 (2.16)	42.7 (1.68)	41.0 (1.61)	56.4 (2.22)	98.8 (3.89)	86.9 (3.42)	47.2 (1.86)	733.4 (28.87)
Average precipitation days	8	10	12	17	19	15	15	13	14	16	14	9	161
Average relative humidity (%)	79	79	81	83	82	79	77	77	78	82	82	80	80
Source: Instituto de Hidrologia Meteorologia y Estudios Ambientales

Climate data for Funza (Flores Colombianas), elevation 2,560 m (8,400 ft), (1981–2010)
Month	Jan	Feb	Mar	Apr	May	Jun	Jul	Aug	Sep	Oct	Nov	Dec	Year
Mean daily maximum °C (°F)	20.0 (68.0)	20.0 (68.0)	19.6 (67.3)	19.2 (66.6)	19.2 (66.6)	18.7 (65.7)	18.6 (65.5)	18.7 (65.7)	18.7 (65.7)	18.9 (66.0)	19.0 (66.2)	19.5 (67.1)	19.2 (66.5)
Mean daily minimum °C (°F)	5.7 (42.3)	6.8 (44.2)	7.6 (45.7)	8.8 (47.8)	8.9 (48.0)	8.6 (47.5)	8.1 (46.6)	7.8 (46.0)	7.3 (45.1)	7.7 (45.9)	8.1 (46.6)	6.9 (44.4)	7.7 (45.9)
Average precipitation mm (inches)	28.6 (1.13)	43.5 (1.71)	74.8 (2.94)	93.9 (3.70)	98.5 (3.88)	57.4 (2.26)	52.5 (2.07)	39.2 (1.54)	50.2 (1.98)	91.8 (3.61)	71.9 (2.83)	41.1 (1.62)	719.1 (28.31)
Average precipitation days	7	9	13	15	17	14	13	12	12	15	15	9	147
Source: Instituto de Hidrologia Meteorologia y Estudios Ambientales

== Gallery ==
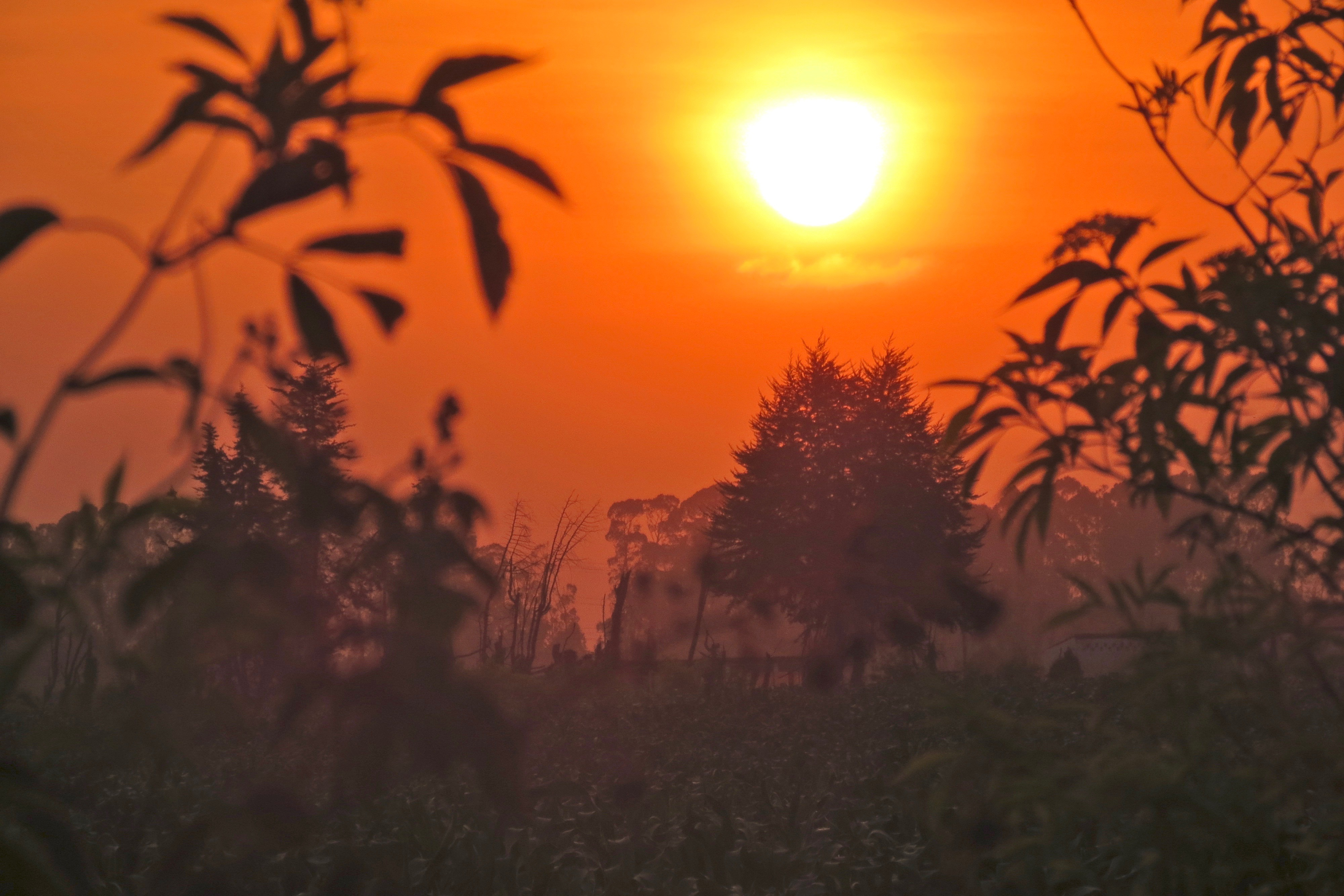
Sunset in Funza

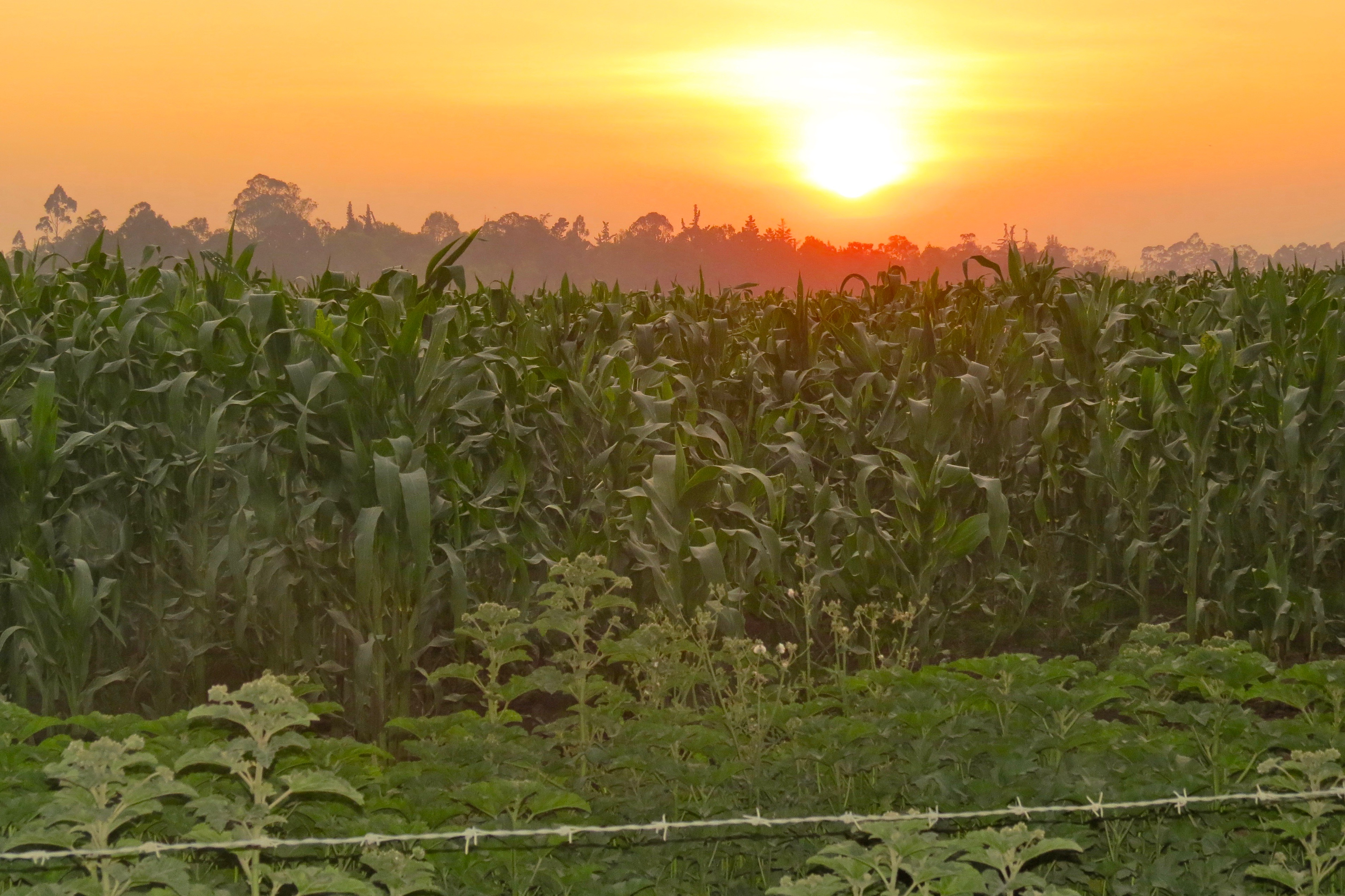
Maize fields in Funza

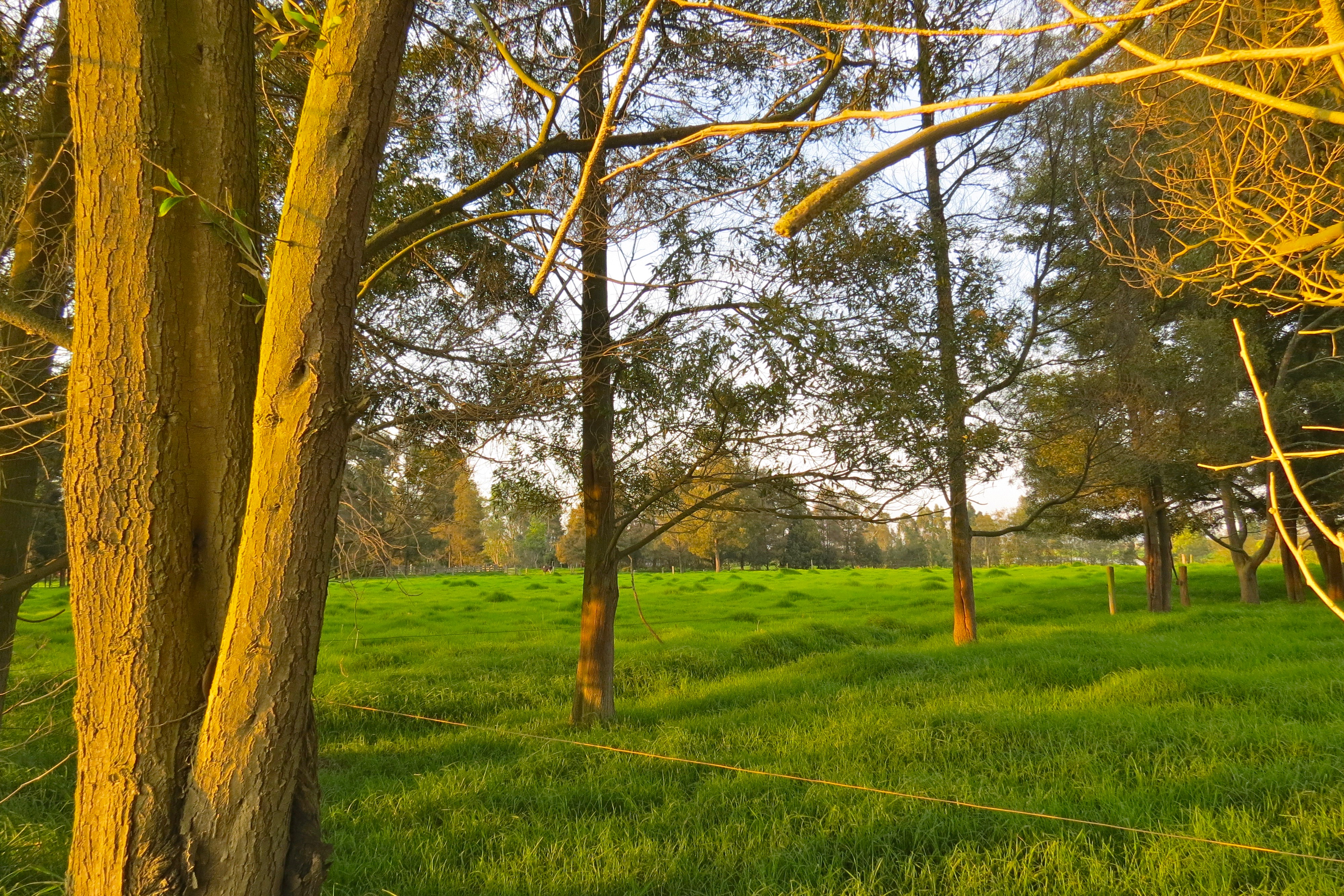
Green area in Funza

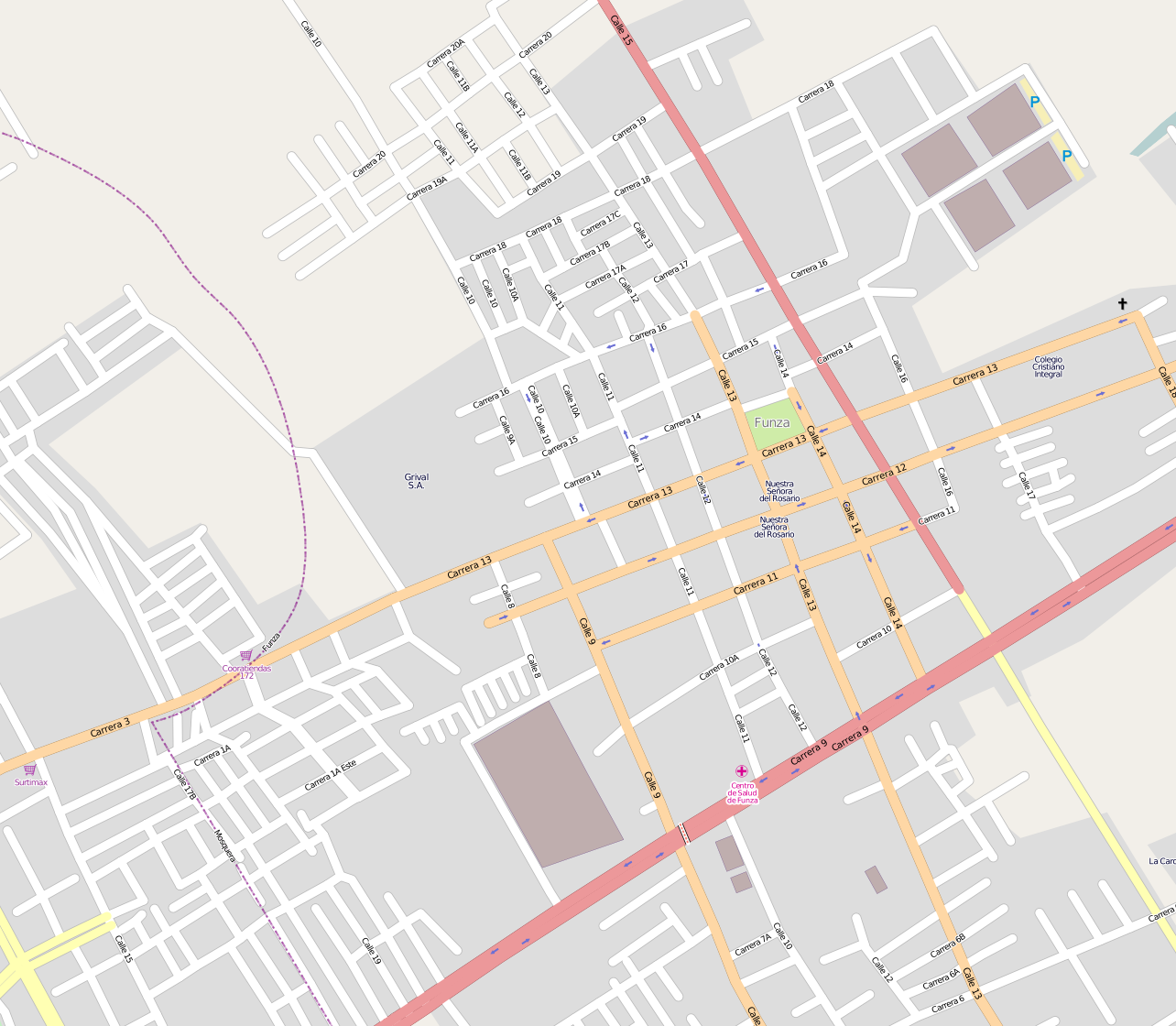
Map of Funza

== See also ==
- Spanish conquest of the Muisca
- Muisca
- Wetlands of Bogotá
