= Diocese of Facatativá =

Diocese of the Catholic Church in Colombia

Coordinates: 4.8094°N 74.3538°W

Diocese of Facatativá Dioecesis Facatativensis

Catholic

Location
- Country: Colombia
- Ecclesiastical province: Bogotá

Statistics
- Area: 2,311 km^{2} (892 sq mi)
- Population: Total; Catholics: (as of 2013); 546,000; 512,000 (93.8%)

Information
- Denomination: Catholic Church
- Rite: Latin Rite
- Established: 16 March 1962 (64 years ago)
- Cathedral: Catedral de la Santísima Virgen del Rosario

Current leadership
- Pope: Leo XIV
- Bishop: Pedro Manuel Salamanca Mantilla
- Bishops emeritus: Luis Gabriel Romero Franco

Map

Website
- Diócesis de Facatativá

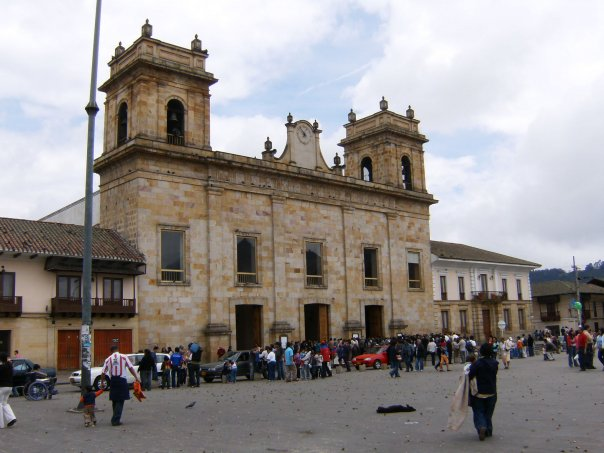
Cathedral of the Most Blessed Virgin of the Rosary

The Roman Catholic Diocese of Facatativá (Latin: Facatativensis) is a diocese located in the northwest of Cundinamarca Department in Colombia. Its see is the city of Facatativá; the diocese is part of the ecclesiastical province of Bogotá in Colombia.

The diocesan territory includes the municipalities of Albán, Bojacá, El Rosal, Facatativá, Funza, Guayabal de Síquima, La Vega, Madrid, Mosquera, Nimaima, Nocaima, Quebradanegra, San Francisco de Sales, Sasaima, Subachoque, Supatá, Tabio, Tenjo, Tobía, Útica, Vergara, Villeta and Zipacón in Cundinamarca.

The diocese is bordered by the Diocese of Zipaquirá to the north, the Dioceses of Engativá and Fontibón to the east, the Diocese of Girardot to the southwest, and the Diocese of La Dorada-Guaduas to the northwest.

== History ==
The Diocese of Facatativá was erected on 16 March 1962 from territory of the Archdiocese of Bogotá and the Diocese of Zipaquirá. Raúl Zambrano Camader was appointed the first bishop of the diocese.

In 1971, the Bishops of Zipaquirá and Facatativá agreed to transfer the parishes of La Peña, Topaipí and San Antonio de Aguilera (a rural parish of Topaipí) back to the Diocese of Zipaquirá. On 29 March 1984, the Diocese of La Dorada-Guaduas was erected, including territory ceded from the Diocese of Facatativá and two others.

== Seminary ==
Seminarians from the Diocese of Facatativá attend the Major Seminary of Bogotá.

== Bishops ==
=== Ordinaries ===
- Raul Zambrano Camader (26 April 1962 – 18 December 1972)
- Hernando Velásquez Lotero (27 April 1973 – 18 May 1985), resigned
- Luis Gabriel Romero Franco (15 April 1986 – 13 November 2010), retired
- Luis Antonio Nova Rocha (22 January 2011 – 9 April 2013)
- José Miguel Gómez Rodríguez (23 February 2015 – 25 April 2021), appointed Archbishop of Manizales
- Pedro Manuel Salamanca Mantilla (21 April 2022 – Present)

=== Other priest of this diocese who became bishop ===
- Jaime Prieto Amaya, appointed Bishop of Barrancabermeja in 1993

== See also ==
- Roman Catholicism in Colombia
