= Mariquita Province =

Administrative entity of New Granada (1550–1861)

Coordinates: 5.2°N 74.883333°W

Mariquita
- Province of the Viceroyalty of New Granada, United Provinces of New Granada, Gran Colombia, Republic of New Granada
- 1550–1861
- Location of the province of Mariquita in New Granada around 1810
- Location of the province in New Granada around 1855
- Capital: Mariquita
- Demonym: Mariquiteñ(o/a), Neogranadin(o/a)
- Area
  - 1851: 13,450 km^{2} (5,190 sq mi)
- Population
  - 1789: 47,138
  - 1835: 79,721
  - 1843: 89,460
  - 1851: 105,105
  - Type: Corregimiento
- Historical era: Spanish colonization of the Americas; Colombian War of Independence
  - Established: 1550
  - Establishment: 1550
  - Dissolution: July 12, 1861
  - Disestablished: 1861
Preceded by
Panches
Pijaos
New Kingdom of Granada
Free State of Marquita
Succeeded by
Free State of Marquita
Cundinamarca Department (1824)
Sovereign State of Tolima

The Province of Mariquita, also known as the Governorate of Mariquita during the Spanish Empire, was an administrative and territorial entity in New Granada created on 1550 as a corregimiento within the Viceroyalty of Peru. A royal decree (real cédula), issued by king Philip V of Spain on 1717, created the Viceroyalty of New Granada and transferred the province to this new territory.

During the early stages of the Spanish American Wars of Independence (1810-1816), the Province of Neiva declared itself to be a Free State and joined the United Provinces of New Granada. During the period known as Gran Colombia, the province became part of the Department of Cundinamarca, which back then covered all the territory of modern-day Colombia and Panama.

After the dissolution of Gran Colombia, the province joined the Republic of New Granada, a centralist nation, until the federalist system was adopted by New Granada in 1858 and the region became one of the constituent provinces of the Sovereign State of Tolima.

== History ==
=== Pre-Columbian era ===
Prior to Spanish colonization, the area that was to become Marquita Province was home to several indigenous societies that had established complex trade networks with inhabitants of the Central and Eastern Cordilleras. Notable among these groups were the Ondaimas, Babadujos, Yaporoges, Panches, and Pijaos. These indigenous peoples were known for their bravery, resilience, and fierce resistance to Spanish conquest.

The Spanish crown, under the direction of Don Juan de Borja, president of the Real Audiencia, launched a campaign of extermination against these indigenous groups. Despite facing severe atrocities, many indigenous people, such as those led by Cacique Calarla, chose death over submission to Spanish rule.

The present-day city of Honda was originally an indigenous settlement, strategically located as a port and trading hub.

=== Spanish rule ===
Between 1510 and 1540, the main governorships of the New Kingdom of Granada were established from the dissolution of New Andalusia and Castilla de Oro: Santa Marta, Cartagena, and Popayán. In 1564, the Real Audiencia of Santa Fe de Bogotá was established, which prompted a new division of the territory. Mariquita was designated as one of the two corregimientos of royal provision (the other being Tunja); corregimientos constituted the basic administrative division, equivalent to Spanish municipalities.

Spain later divided the territory of the New Kingdom of Granada into provinces. In 1763, Mariquita formally became one of these provinces, a designation it retained during the colonial period and much of the republican era. Through the real cedulá of 1717, it became part of the Viceroyalty of New Granada, separate from the Viceroyalty of Peru.

A significant event during this period was the selection of Mariquita by José Celestino Mutis in 1783 as the headquarters for the Royal Botanical Expedition to New Granada. The town was also the birthplace of prosecutor Francisco Antonio Moreno y Escandón, colonial painter Gaspar de Figueroa, and prominent patriot José León Armero Racines.

The population of Honda, the province's most important port and second capital, joined the revolt of the comuneros on June 23, 1781. Rebels attacked tobacco and aguardiente stores and the local jail, freeing prisoners who had communicated with José Antonio Galán, then in Mariquita.

=== Independence ===
Between 1807 and 1808, French troops under Napoleon Bonaparte invaded Spain, with Napoleon appointing his brother Joseph Bonaparte as king. Consequently, Spain underwent its own war of independence against France from 1800 to 1814, a period that Spanish colonies seized upon to assert their right to self-governance.

In 1810, Santafé de Bogotá and fifteen other localities in New Granada established Supreme Juntas. These included juntas in Santa Fe de Antioquia (led by Francisco de Ayala), Cali (Joaquín de Caizedo y Cuero), Cartagena (José María García de Toledo), Mompós (José María Salazar and José María Gutiérrez de Caviedes), Neiva (José Domingo Falla), Pamplona (Domingo Tomás de Burgos), Popayán (Miguel Tacón, later replaced by Joaquín de Caizedo y Cuero), Santa Marta (Víctor de Salcedo), Socorro (José Lorenzo Plata), Sogamoso (Domingo José Benítez), Tunja (Juan Agustín de la Rocha), Nóvita (Miguel Antonio Moreno), Mariquita (Francisco de Mesa y Armero), Girón (Eloy Valenzuela), and Citará (José María Valencia). These provinces formed the first independent republic of Colombia, known as the United Provinces of New Granada.

On July 25, 1810, the Cabildo of Honda recognized the authority of the Junta of Santa Fe, with a junta presided over by Francisco de Mesa y Armero. On August 13 of the same year, Ibagué aligned itself with Santa Fe, rejecting the Junta of Mariquita. On March 28, 1811, Cundinamarca's troops entered Honda, and on April 1, Manuel del Castillo y Rada dissolved the juntas of Honda and Mariquita, annexing the territories to Santa Fe. In August 1812, the cabildo of Ibagué separated from Cundinamarca and urged other Mariquita cabildos to follow suit. In March 1813, Ignacio de Herrera was appointed governor of Mariquita and on August 14 declared independence from Cundinamarca.

The independence of the province of Mariquita was proclaimed on December 22, 1814. The Constituent Convention of the Free State of Mariquita convened on March 3, 1815, in the Convention Palace of Honda and issued its constitution on June 21 of the same year. This Convention declared that the province of Mariquita would be independent from Spain, Cundinamarca, or any other government not popularly and legitimately elected by the people.

In April 1816, the royalist Juan Lerchundi captured Honda. On May 10, he entered the city with Spanish troops under the command of Colonel José Donato Ruiz de Santacruz. Lerchundi initiated a purge of patriots who had promoted the province's independence. Several patriots were executed at the scaffold in the plaza of Alto de Honda, including notable residents of the villa: Sinforoso Pava, Don Sebastián de Armero, and Don Eduardo de la Concepción Gallón y Massenet. The latter was shot and dismembered, with his body parts displayed at the entrance of Honda towards the royal road of Mariquita, the port of Arrancaplumas on the Magdalena River, and towards the road to Santa Fe near Guaduas. The new governor and captain general of New Granada, Francisco Montalvo Ambulodi, assumed his position on May 30, 1813, and was promoted to viceroy on April 28, 1816. Spanish envoy General Morillo arrived in Santa Marta on July 22, 1815, to begin the reconquest of New Granada. This period marked the beginning of what is known in Colombian history as the Reign of Terror.

=== Republican era ===
Following the liberation of New Granada and Venezuela, the Congress of Angostura promulgated the Fundamental Law on December 17, 1819, establishing the Republic of Colombia. Francisco Antonio Zea, a native of Medellín, was appointed as vice president. The newly formed republic united New Granada and Venezuela, dividing them into three departments: Cundinamarca, Venezuela, and Quito. The province of Mariquita was incorporated into the department of Cundinamarca.

On July 12, 1821, under the presidency of José Manuel Restrepo, the Congress of Cúcuta enacted the Constitution of Cúcuta, based on the Angostura model. This constitution further divided the republic into departments and provinces. Mariquita retained its status as a province within the department of Cundinamarca, with the city of Honda designated as its capital.

Following the dissolution of Gran Colombia in 1830, the Constitution of 1832 was enacted, reorganizing the Republic of New Granada into provinces. These mirrored the administrative divisions of 1810. Among these provinces was Mariquita, which encompassed approximately the territory of the present-day department of Tolima, as well as portions of what are now Antioquia, Caldas, and Cundinamarca.

In 1840, General José María Vesga, the governor of Mariquita province, rebelled against the national government. A minor skirmish occurred between republican forces and rebels near Quebradaseca. Vesga's forces retreated to the plains of Calunga, where they were defeated by General Joaquín París's troops on January 9, 1841.

The Constitution of 1843 implemented a new administrative division of the Republic of New Granada into provinces, which were further subdivided into cantons, and these into parochial districts. Twenty provinces were established, including Mariquita, which remained unchanged.

When the Conservatives returned to power in 1855, Congress approved the unification of provinces, this time as federal states. The Granadine Confederation of 1857 defined eight Federal States, including the Sovereign State of Cundinamarca. In 1861, the Sovereign State of Tolima was created from the provinces of Mariquita and Neiva, which until then had belonged to Cundinamarca.

== Geography ==
=== Topography ===
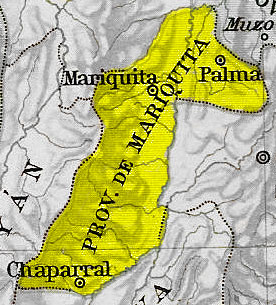
Province of Mariquita.

The province of Mariquita occupied covered an area from the western bank of the Magdalena River to the foothills of the Cordillera Central, occupying the middle valley of the river. Due to these physical barriers, communication with other provinces was difficult, especially with Antioquia and Bogotá.

Like the modern departments that descend from the province, the terrain was traversed by countless rivers, streams, and creeks, including the Magdalena. The Magdalena in those days provided economic activity both in the form of fish and through communication and trade with other regions of the country.

=== Boundaries ===
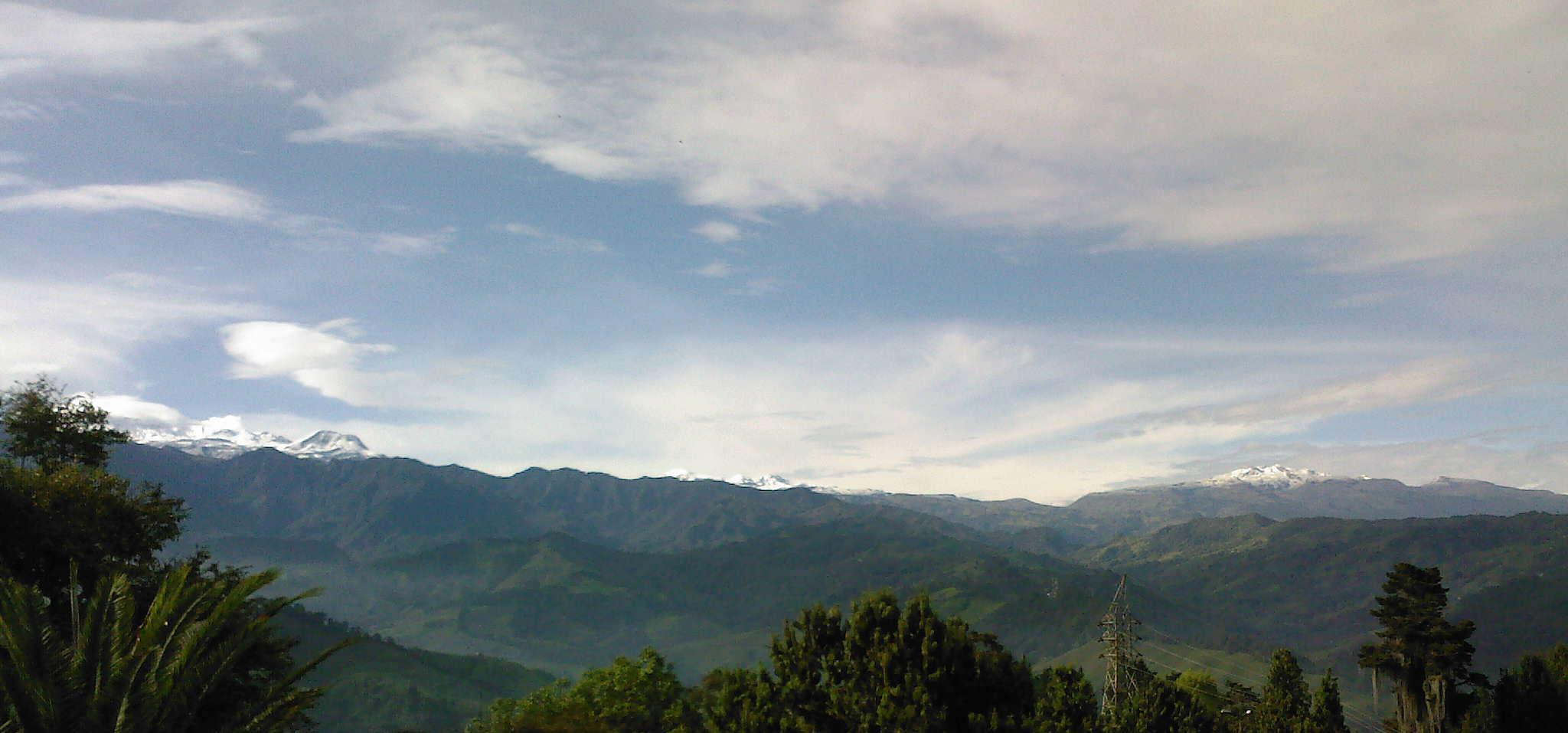
Nevado del Ruiz, Santa Isabel, and Tolima volcanoes.

The boundaries of the province were not stable throughout the 300 years of Spanish rule in the region. Although the general extent of the province almost always corresponded to what is now the department of Tolima, there were constant changes to the edges, particularly in the Nare River region). The limited knowledge of the land did not allow for establishing definite boundaries between one governorship and another, except in the case of easily identifiable natural boundaries.

At the time of the proclamation of independence (1814), Mariquita bordered the following provinces (clockwise): Antioquia, Tunja, Santa Fe, Neiva, and Popayán. The boundaries between provinces were not entirely clear since, except for the border marked by the Magdalena and Saldaña rivers, they were never clearly determined. However, this changed in the 1850s when Agustín Codazzi made a detailed description of the boundaries, as well as the geography, of most of the provinces that made up the Republic of New Granada for the Chorographic Commission (1850–1859).

The boundaries of the province of Mariquita in 1850 were primarily defined by geographical features. Beginning at the headwaters of the Chinchiná River in the peaks of the Cordillera Central, the border traversed the snow-capped peaks of Ruiz, Santa Isabel, and Quindío, as well as the páramos of Cumbara, Miraflores, Chiche, Iraca, Fraile, and Isabelilla. From this point, it extended to the headwaters of the Saldaña River, following its course to its confluence with the Magdalena River. The boundary then continued downstream along the Magdalena to the mouth of the Río Seco, crossed this river, and proceeded along the Negro River to the high peaks of the Eastern Cordillera. From there, it reached the headwaters of the Ermitaño River, following it to its mouth in the Magdalena River.

The boundary then followed the course of the Magdalena River to the mouth of the Nus River. It traced the Nus upstream to the mountain range separating the watersheds of the Samaná Norte and Cocorná rivers. Continuing through the highlands of Tigre and Canelo, it reached the mouth of La Mulata Creek in the Samaná River. The border then followed the Samaná to its confluence with the La Miel River, tracing the latter upstream to its source in the Nevado del Ruiz. Finally, it extended to the headwaters of the Azufral and Chinchiná creeks, thus completing the demarcation of the province.

=== Territorial division ===
The province of Mariquita had various types of territorial divisions. Initially, it was divided into partidos, which were later called jurisdictions. With the arrival of independence, these subdivisions came to be called cantons, though the boundaries were modified and some subdivisions were merged.

In 1825, the province was divided into the cantons of Mariquita, Honda, Ibagué and La Palma. By 1835, Mariquita had the cantons of Mariquita, Espinal, Honda, Ibagué and La Palma. In 1843, it was divided into the cantons of Mariquita, Castrolarma, Espinal, Honda, Ibagué and La Palma.

Between 1843 and 1851, the province was composed of the following cantons, parochial districts, and villages:

- Canton of Honda: Honda, Ambalema, Calamoima, Méndez and Nare.
- Canton of Castrolarma: Chaparral and Ortega.
- Canton of Espinal: Espinal, Guamo and San Luis.
- Canton of Ibagué: Ibagué, Coello, Miraflores, Piedras, Valdesina, Valle de San Juan and Venadillo.
- Canton of Mariquita: Mariquita, Guayabal, Peladeros and Santana.
- Canton of La Palma: La Palma, Caparrapí, Peña, Peñón, Topaipí and Yacopí.

== Demographics ==
According to data provided by the secretary of the Viceroyalty of New Granada, Francisco Silvestre, in his book Description of the Kingdom of Santafé de Bogotá in 1789, the province had a population of 47,138 inhabitants. By 1835, the province had grown to 79,721 inhabitants. According to the 1851 census, the province had 105,105 inhabitants, of which 51,380 were men and 53,725 were women.

== See also ==
- Subdivisions of Gran Colombia
- Provinces of the Republic of New Granada
