= Gualivá Province =

Gualivá Province Provincia de Gualivá
- Province
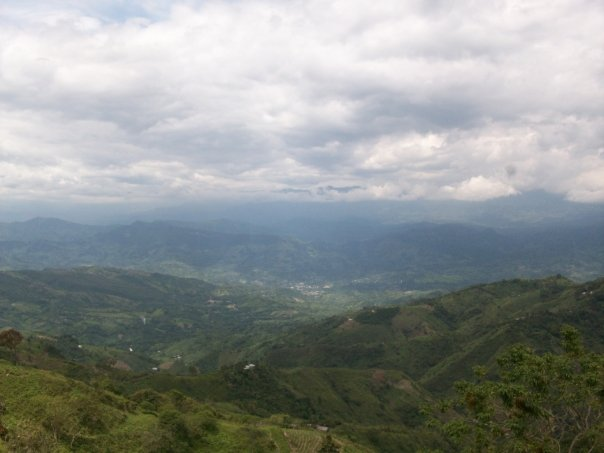
- View of Villeta
- Etymology: Gualivá River
- Location of Gualivá Province in Colombia
- Coordinates: 5°00′46″N 74°28′23″W
- Country: Colombia
- Department: Cundinamarca
- Capital: Villeta
- Municipalities: 12
- Time zone: UTC−05:00 (COT)
- Indigenous groups: Muisca; Panche

Gualivá Province (Spanish: Provincia de Gualivá) is one of the 15 provinces in the Cundinamarca Department, Colombia. Gualivá borders the Lower Magdalena Province to the west, to the north the Rionegro Province, to the east and southeast the Western Savanna Province, to the south slightly the Tequendama Province and to the southwest the Central Magdalena Province.

== Municipalities ==
Gualivá Province contains twelve municipalities:

- Albán
- La Peña
- La Vega
- Nimaima
- Nocaima
- Quebradanegra
- San Francisco
- Sasaima
- Supatá
- Útica
- Vergara
- Villeta
