= El Peñón, Cundinamarca =

El Peñón El Peñón de Terama
- Municipality and town
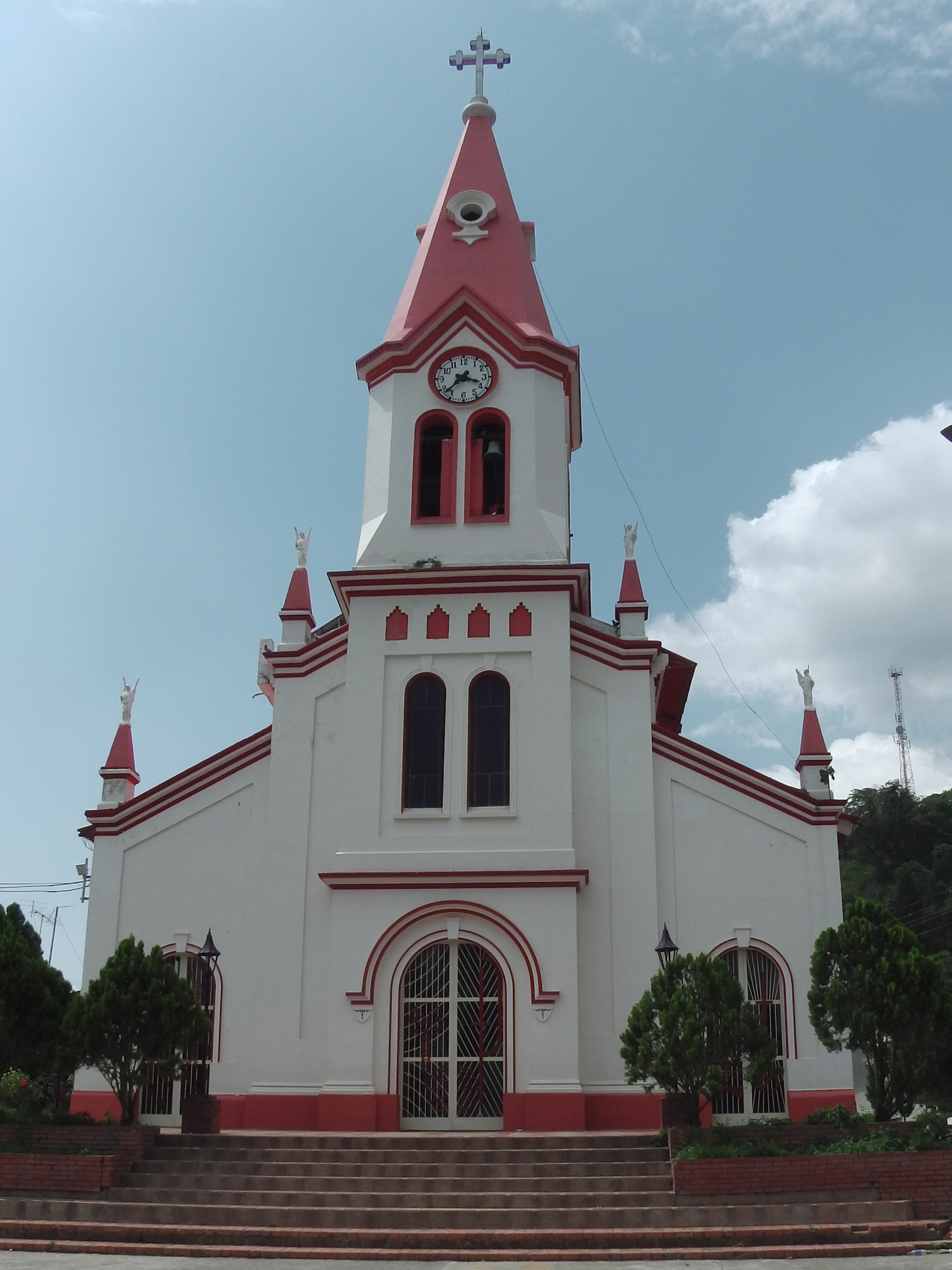
- Church of El Peñón

- Flag Coat of arms

- Location of El Peñón in Cundinamarca

- Location in Colombia
- Coordinates: 5°15′6″N 74°17′10″W
- Country: Colombia
- Department: Cundinamarca
- Province: Rionegro
- Founded: 1822
- Founder: Pedro Bustos

Government
  - Mayor: Gustavo Adolfo Mojica Vargas (2016-2019)

Area
  - Municipality and town: 132 km^{2} (51 sq mi)
- Elevation: 1,310 m (4,300 ft)

Population (2015)
  - Municipality and town: 4,805
  - Density: 36.4/km^{2} (94.3/sq mi)
  - Urban: 445
- Time zone: UTC-5 (Colombia Standard Time)
- Website: Official website

El Peñón is a municipality and town of Colombia in the department of Cundinamarca. It is located at an altitude of 1,310 metres (4,300 ft) in the western flanks of the Eastern Ranges of the Colombian Andes. The municipality, part of the Rionegro Province borders Topaipí in the north, Vergara and Nimaima in the south, Pacho in the east and La Peña and La Palma in the west. The municipality is 120 kilometres (75 mi) northwest of the capital Bogotá and thanks to the lower elevation has a temperate climate averaging 21 °C (70 °F).

== Geology ==
The Lower Cretaceous El Peñón Formation is named after El Peñón.

== History ==
The area of El Peñón before the Spanish conquest was inhabited by the Panche. Modern El Peñón was founded in 1822 by Pedro Bustos as El Peñón de Terama, named after a cacique of the Panche that resisted the Spanish conquistadors and died in 1565.
