= Pacho =

- Municipality and town
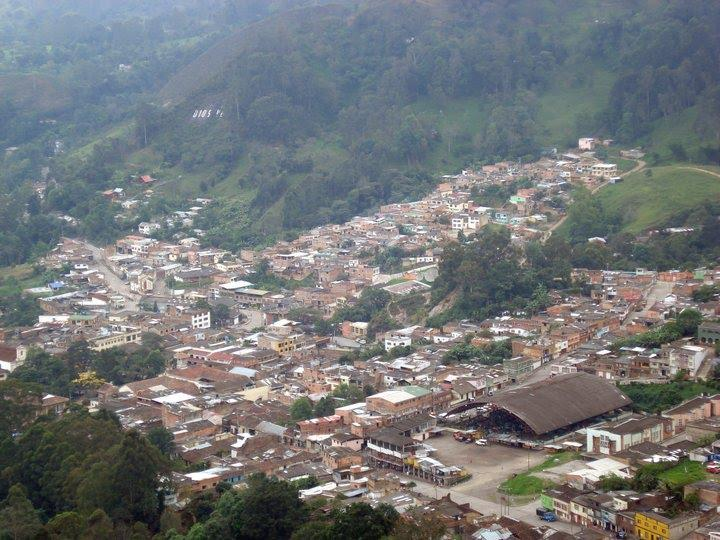
- View of Pacho

- Flag Coat of arms

- Location of the municipality and town inside Cundinamarca department of Colombia

- Location in Colombia
- Coordinates: 5°7′50″N 74°9′30″W
- Country: Colombia
- Department: Cundinamarca
- Province: Rionegro Province
- Founded: 25 August 1604
- Founder: Lorencio de Terrones

Government
  - Mayor: Ronald David Rangel Bermúdez (2016–2019)

Area
  - Municipality and town: 402.6 km^{2} (155.4 sq mi)
  - Urban: 4.16 km^{2} (1.61 sq mi)
- Elevation: 2,136 m (7,008 ft)

Population (2018 census)
  - Municipality and town: 24,413
  - Density: 60.64/km^{2} (157.1/sq mi)
  - Urban: 12,714
  - Urban density: 3,060/km^{2} (7,920/sq mi)
- Time zone: UTC-5 (Colombia Standard Time)
- Website: Official website

Pacho is a municipality and town of Colombia in the department of Cundinamarca. Pacho is part of the Rionegro Province and the urban centre is situated at a distance of 88 kilometres (55 mi) from the capital Bogotá at an altitude of 2,136 metres (7,008 ft), while the altitude ranges from 1,000 metres (3,300 ft) to 3,700 metres (12,100 ft). The municipality borders San Cayetano, Villagómez and Topaipí in the north, Supatá and Subachoque in the south, Vergara and El Peñón in the west and in the east Zipaquirá, Tausa and Cogua.

== Etymology ==
In the times before the Spanish conquest of the Muisca, Pacho was called Guataque or Gotaque; Gua; "mountain", Tha; "strong" and Que; "elevated", so "strong elevated mountain". The modern name is also derived from Chibcha; Pa is "father" and chó is "good"; "good father".

== History ==
The area of Pacho before becoming part of the New Kingdom of Granada was inhabited by the Muisca where the area of Pacho formed the western boundary of the Muisca Confederation, bordering the Muzo in the northwest and the Panche or Colima in the west and southwest.

Modern Pacho was founded on August 25, 1604, by Lorencio de Terrones.

== Climate ==
Pacho has a subtropical highland climate (Köppen: Cfb) with consistently mild temperatures.

Climate data for Pacho (Cabrera La), elevation 2,000 m (6,600 ft), (1981–2010)
Month	Jan	Feb	Mar	Apr	May	Jun	Jul	Aug	Sep	Oct	Nov	Dec	Year
Mean daily maximum °C (°F)	21.1 (70.0)	21.2 (70.2)	21.5 (70.7)	21.4 (70.5)	21.7 (71.1)	21.7 (71.1)	21.9 (71.4)	22.4 (72.3)	22.2 (72.0)	21.3 (70.3)	20.8 (69.4)	20.8 (69.4)	21.5 (70.7)
Daily mean °C (°F)	16.5 (61.7)	16.5 (61.7)	16.7 (62.1)	16.8 (62.2)	17.0 (62.6)	17.0 (62.6)	17.1 (62.8)	17.2 (63.0)	16.9 (62.4)	16.6 (61.9)	16.5 (61.7)	16.5 (61.7)	16.8 (62.2)
Mean daily minimum °C (°F)	12.2 (54.0)	12.6 (54.7)	13.0 (55.4)	13.7 (56.7)	13.9 (57.0)	13.8 (56.8)	13.4 (56.1)	13.5 (56.3)	13.2 (55.8)	13.1 (55.6)	13.0 (55.4)	12.5 (54.5)	13.2 (55.8)
Average precipitation mm (inches)	107.4 (4.23)	116.3 (4.58)	149.3 (5.88)	182.1 (7.17)	140.8 (5.54)	45.6 (1.80)	41.3 (1.63)	49.0 (1.93)	98.8 (3.89)	214.7 (8.45)	198.5 (7.81)	126.6 (4.98)	1,470.5 (57.89)
Average precipitation days	13	14	18	20	17	11	11	11	14	19	18	15	176
Average relative humidity (%)	85	85	85	86	86	84	84	83	83	86	86	86	85
Source: Instituto de Hidrologia Meteorologia y Estudios Ambientales

== Economy ==
Pacho was already an agricultural area in the times of the Muisca. Today the main agricultural products are coffee, oranges, strawberries, papayas, pineapples, bananas, plantains, potatoes, yuca and flowers. The town also as an important dairy farming industry.

== Born in Pacho ==
- Isabel Bunch de Cortés, Pacho-born writer who referenced her hometown in her works
- Samuel Cabrera, former professional cyclist
- José Gonzalo Rodríguez Gacha, drug lord, part of Medellin Cartel

== Gallery ==
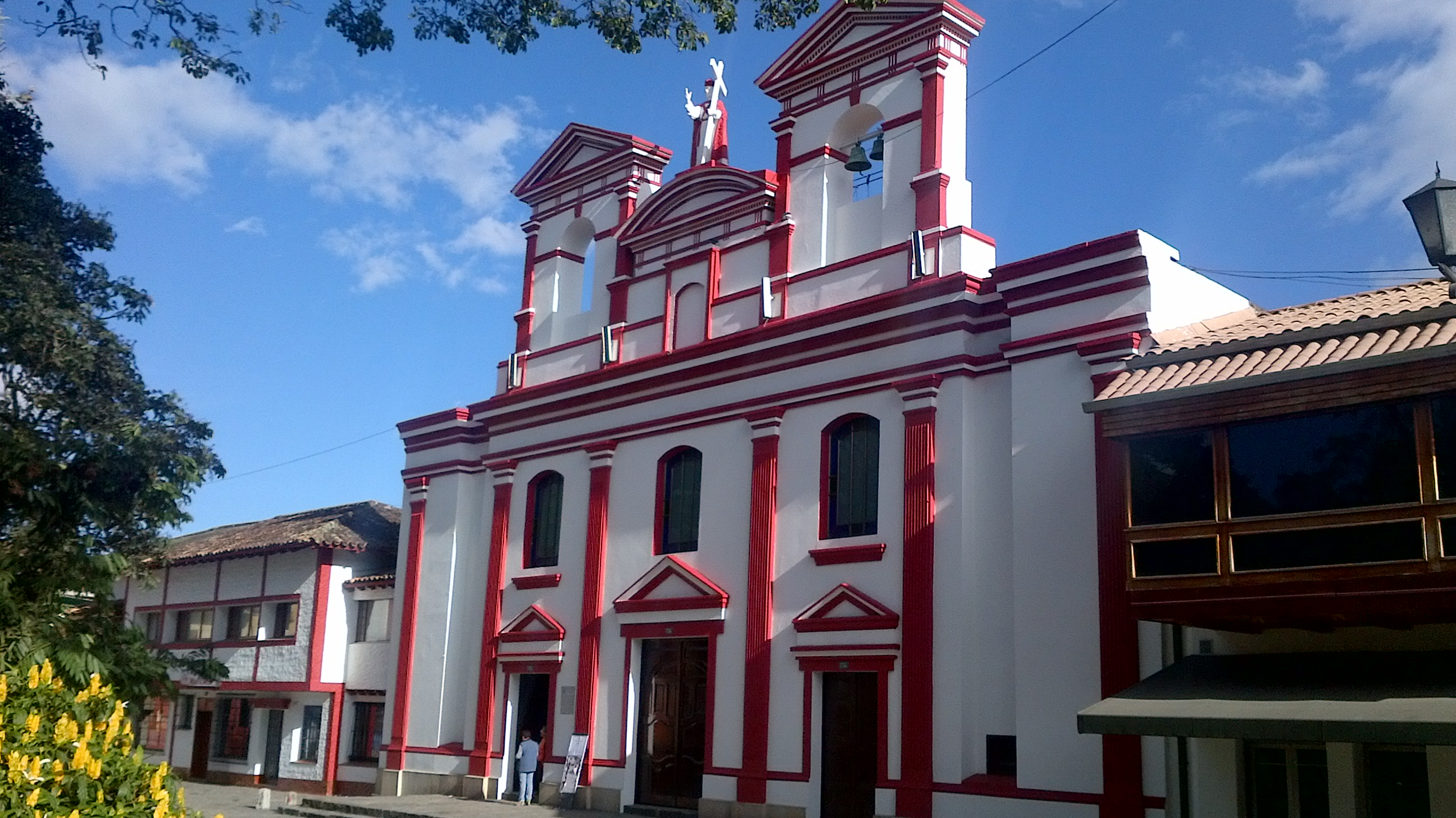
Church of Pacho

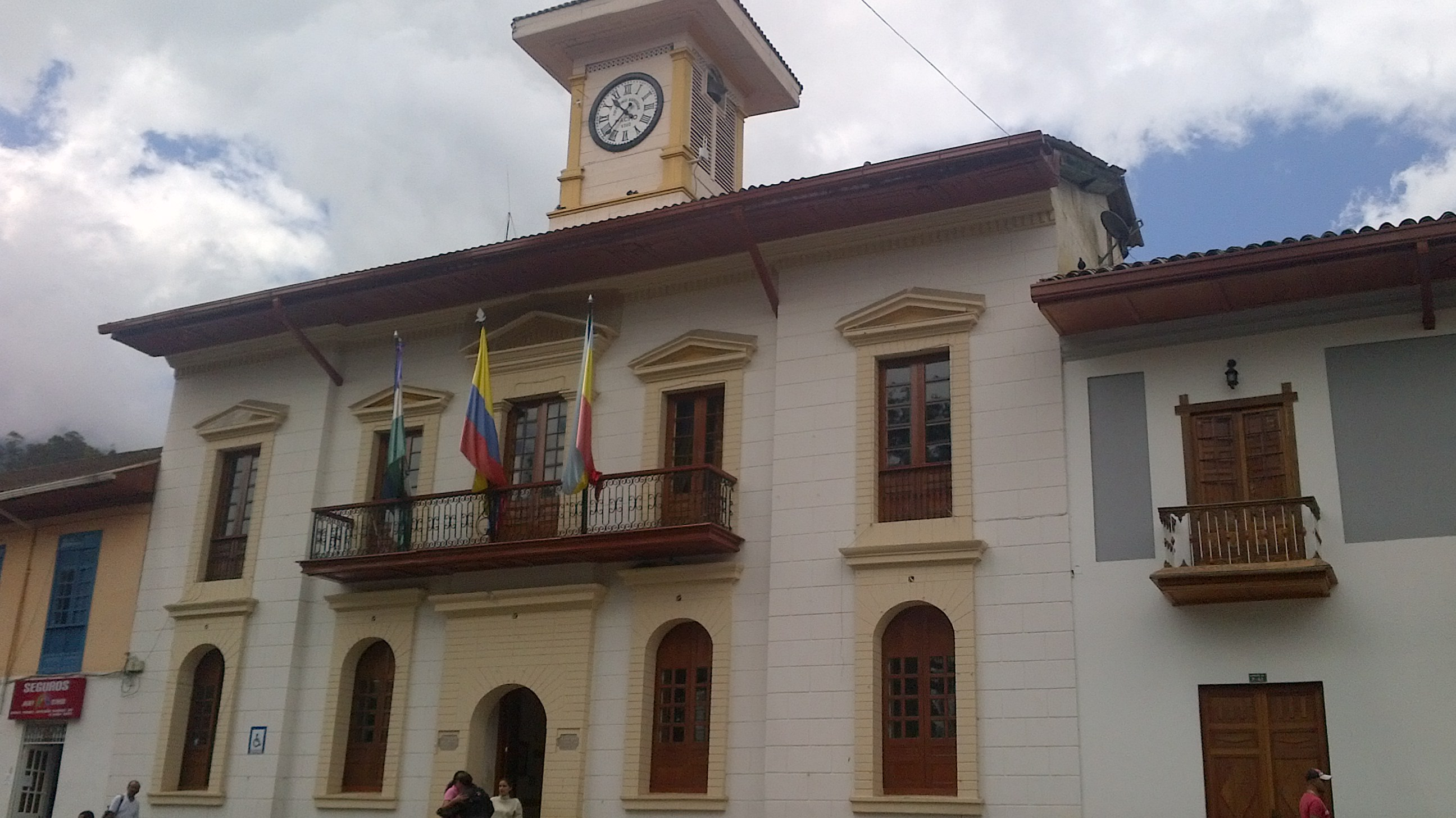
City council building

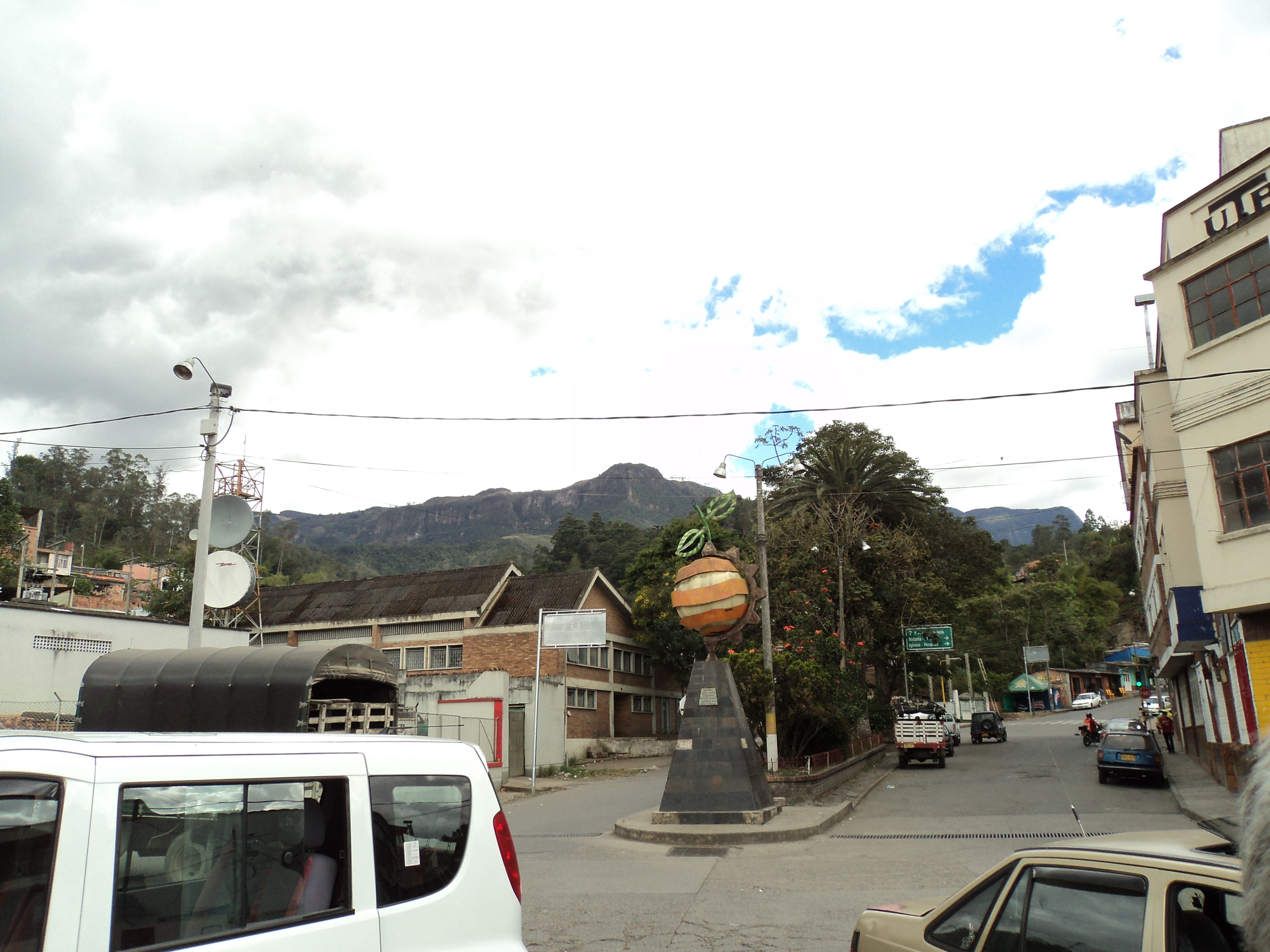
Monument to the orange (fruit)

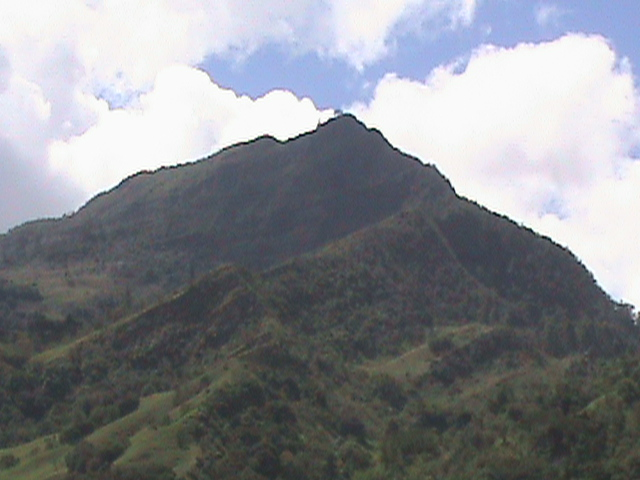
Mountain within Pacho

== See also ==
- Francisco Hélmer Herrera Buitrago, nicknamed Pacho
