= Supatá =

- Municipality and town
- Flag Coat of arms

- Location of the municipality and town of Gómez Plata in the Antioquia Department of Colombia

- Location in Colombia
- Coordinates: 5°3′40″N 74°14′12″W
- Country: Colombia
- Department: Cundinamarca
- Province: Gualivá Province
- Founded: 13 December 1882
- Founder: Venancio and Isidro Aguilera

Government
  - Mayor: Carlos Andrés Cárdenas Gómez (2016-2019)

Area
  - Municipality and town: 117.7 km^{2} (45.4 sq mi)
  - Urban: 0.3 km^{2} (0.12 sq mi)
- Elevation: 1,780 m (5,840 ft)

Population (2015)
  - Municipality and town: 5,022
  - Density: 42.67/km^{2} (110.5/sq mi)
  - Urban: 1,502
- Time zone: UTC-5 (Colombia Standard Time)
- Website: Official website

Supatá is a municipality and town of Colombia in the Gualivá Province, part of the department of Cundinamarca. Supatá is located 76 kilometres (47 mi) north of the Colombian capital Bogotá. Supatá borders the municipalities Pacho, Vergara, Subachoque, La Vega and San Francisco.

== History and geography ==
Before the arrival of the Spanish conquistadores in the central highlands of Colombia, the area around Supatá was inhabited by the Panche people. In Chibcha Supatá means "low and fertile land". The village is located on the northwestern edge of the Bogotá savanna at a relatively low elevation of 1,780 metres (5,840 ft) above sea level, while other areas within the municipality are much higher, up to a maximum elevation of 3,400 metres (11,200 ft).

On the El Tablazo mountain, at an elevation of 3,285 metres (10,778 ft) within the boundaries of Supatá, there's a cave named Cueva Chía ("Chía Cave"). Chía was the Moon goddess of the Muisca who frequently invaded the territories of the Panche. It is said the people hid the treasures of Chía in this cave.

== Economical activities ==
The main economical activity of Supatá is agriculture, particularly coffee, sugar cane, bananas and yuca.

== Gallery ==
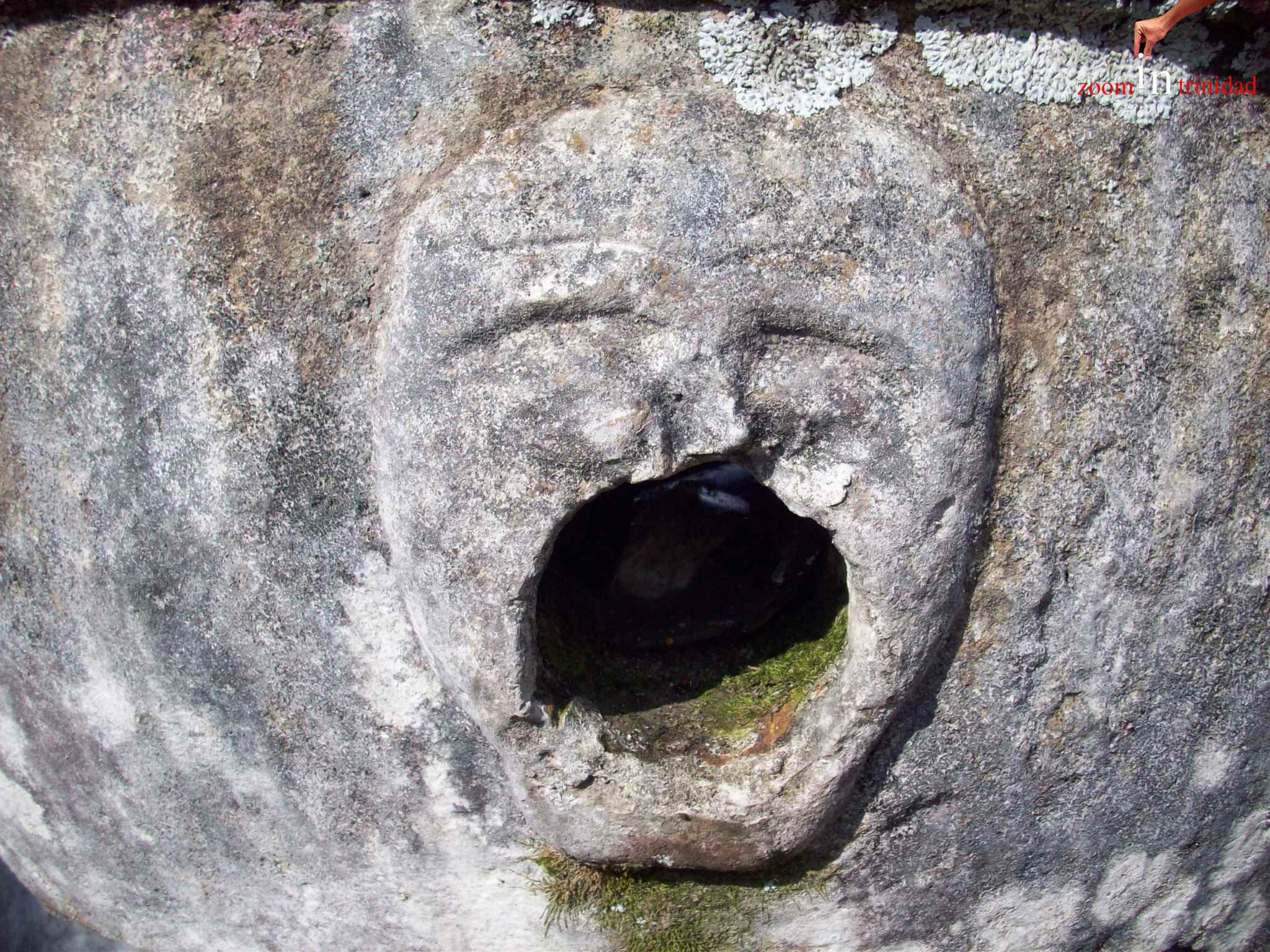
Ancient fountain in Supatá
possibly indigenous

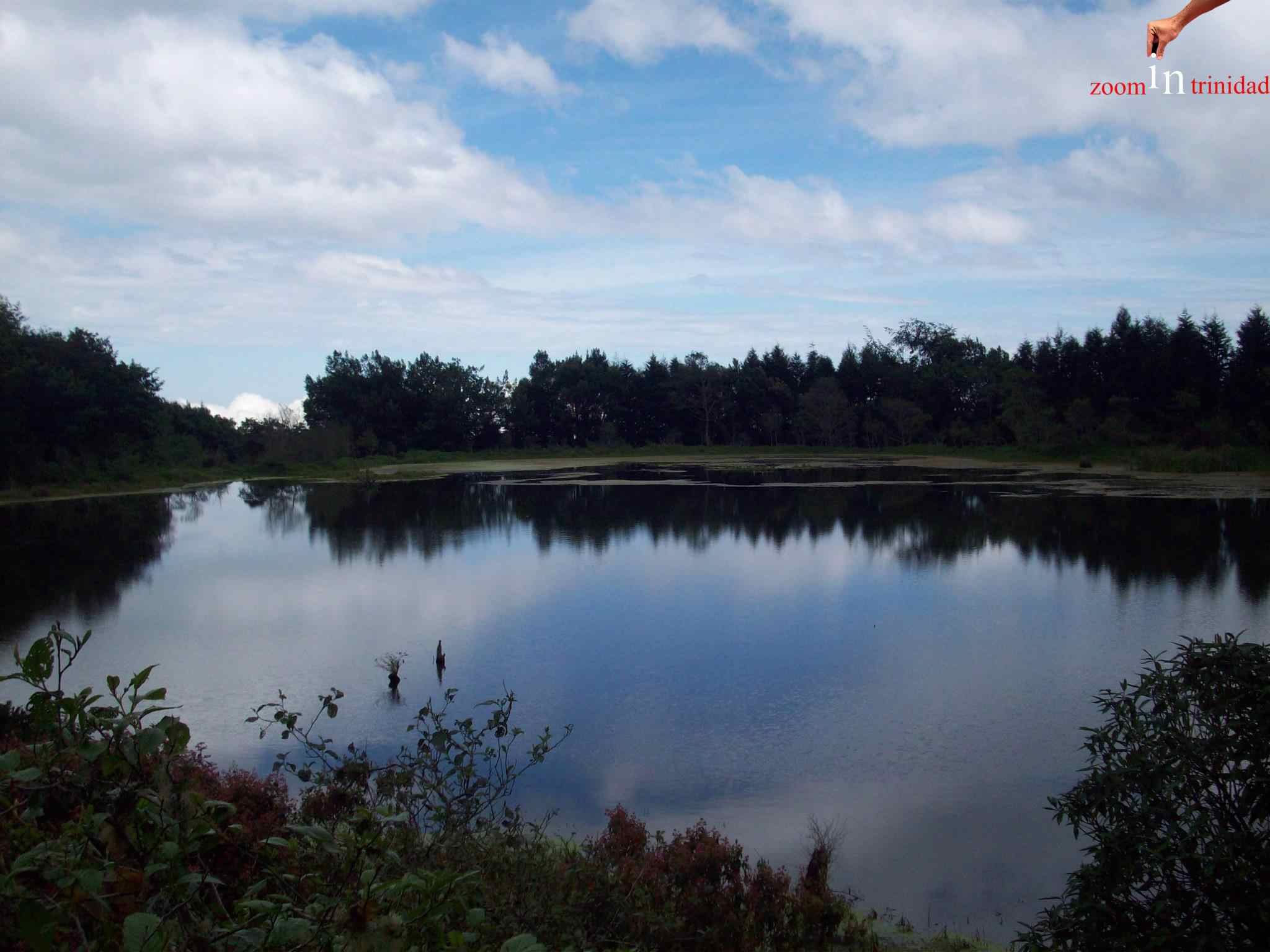
Hispania Lake in Supatá

== Named after Supatá ==
- Supatá golden frog, a species of poisonous frog, found in the vicinity of Supatá has been named after the village
