= José Miguel Gómez Rodríguez =

Colombian Roman Catholic archbishop

Archbishop José Miguel Gómez Rodríguez
- Metropolitan Archbishop of Manizales
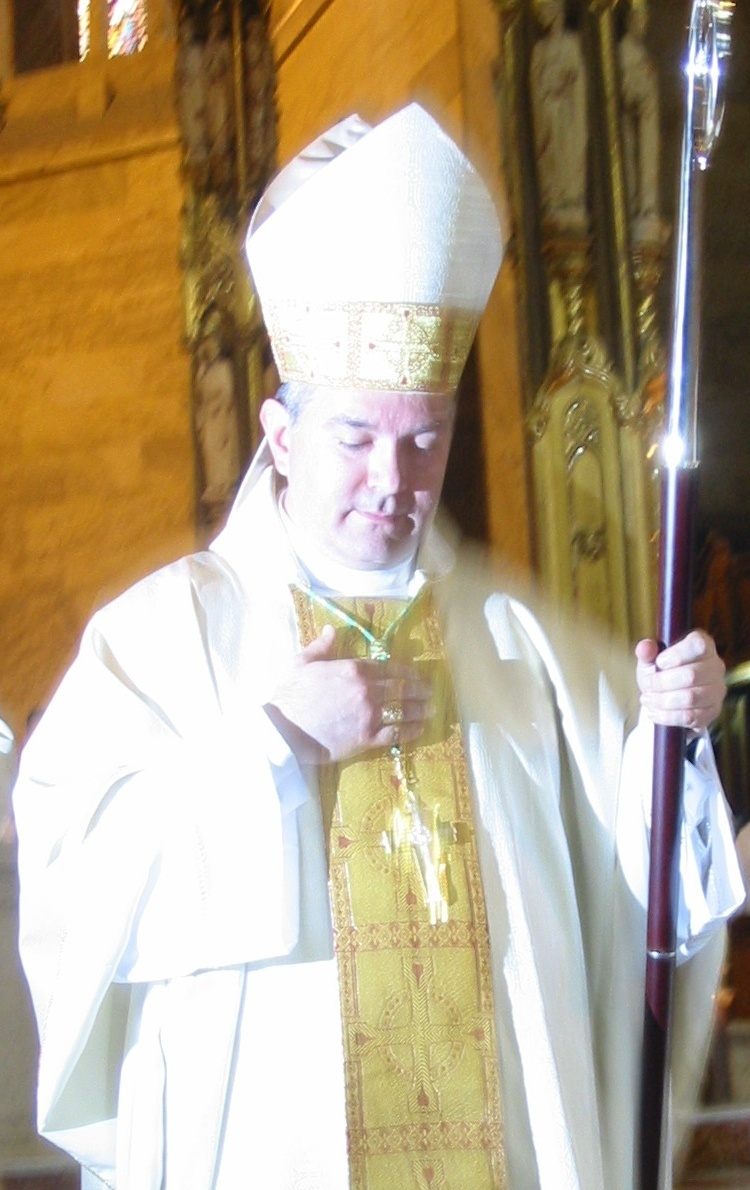
- Gómez Rodríguez in 2005
- Church: Roman Catholic Church
- Archdiocese: Manizales
- Appointed: 25 April 2021
- Installed: 5 June 2021
- Predecessor: Gonzalo Restrepo Restrepo
- Previous posts: Bishop of Facatativá (2015 - 2021); Bishop of Líbano-Honda (2005 - 2015)

Orders
- Ordination: 2 February 1987 by José de Jesús Pimiento Rodriguez
- Consecration: 29 June 1997 by José de Jesús Pimiento Rodriguez

Personal details
- Born: 24 April 1961 (age 65) Bogotá, Colombia
- Education: Pontifical Biblical Institute
- Coat of arms

José Miguel Gómez Rodríguez (born 24 April 1961 in Bogotá) is a Roman Catholic clergyman and metropolitan archbishop of Manizales.

== Priesthood ==
Upon discovering his religious vocation in 1979, he entered the Major Seminary of Manizales, where he studied Philosophy and Theology. The Archbishop of Manizales, José de Jesús Pimiento Rodriguez, consecrated him as a priest on 2 February 1987.

After his ordination, he went to Italy, to study at the Pontifical Biblical Institute of Rome, and obtained the Bachelor of Sacred Scripture degree.

Upon his return to Colombia in 1992, he began his pastorate. During his years as pastor, he held the positions of Parish Vicar of the Parish of the Immaculate Conception in Aguadas and University Chaplain in the Archdiocese of Manizales. In 1993 he became the Parish Priest of the Municipality of Neira. In 1997 he was Parish Priest of the Basilica Minor La Inmaculada Concepción of Salamina and Episcopal Vicar of the North Zone of the Archdiocese of Manizales. From 2003 to 2005 he was a professor of Sacred Scripture at the Major Seminary of Bogotá and Director of the Department of Catechesis and Biblical Pastoral of the Permanent Secretariat of the Episcopal Conference of Colombia (CEC).

== Episcopate ==
Pope John Paul II appointed him Bishop of Líbano-Honda on 22 November 2004. Archbishop Emeritus Pimiento Rodriguez, ordained him as a bishop on 5 February 2005; the co-consecrators were Pedro Cardinal Rubiano Sáenz, Archbishop of Bogotá, and Fabio Betancur Tirado, Archbishop of Manizales. He took possession of the diocese on 12 February 2005.

Pope Francis proclaimed him Bishop of Facatativá on 23 February 2015; he took possession of the diocese on 21 March 2015. He remained apostolic administrator of Líbano-Honda until 5 December 2015.

On 25 April 2021, Pope Francis proclaimed him Metropolitan Archbishop of Manizales; he took possession of the archdiocese on 5 June 2021.

Catholic Church titles
Preceded by Arcadio Bernal Supelano	Bishop of Líbano-Honda; 2005 - 2015	Succeeded by José Luis Henao Cadavid
Preceded by Luis Antonio Nova Rocha	Bishop of Facatativá; 2015 - 2021	Succeeded by –
Preceded by Gonzalo Restrepo Restrepo	Archbishop of Manizales; 2021 -	Succeeded by –
