= Luis Guillermo Pérez =

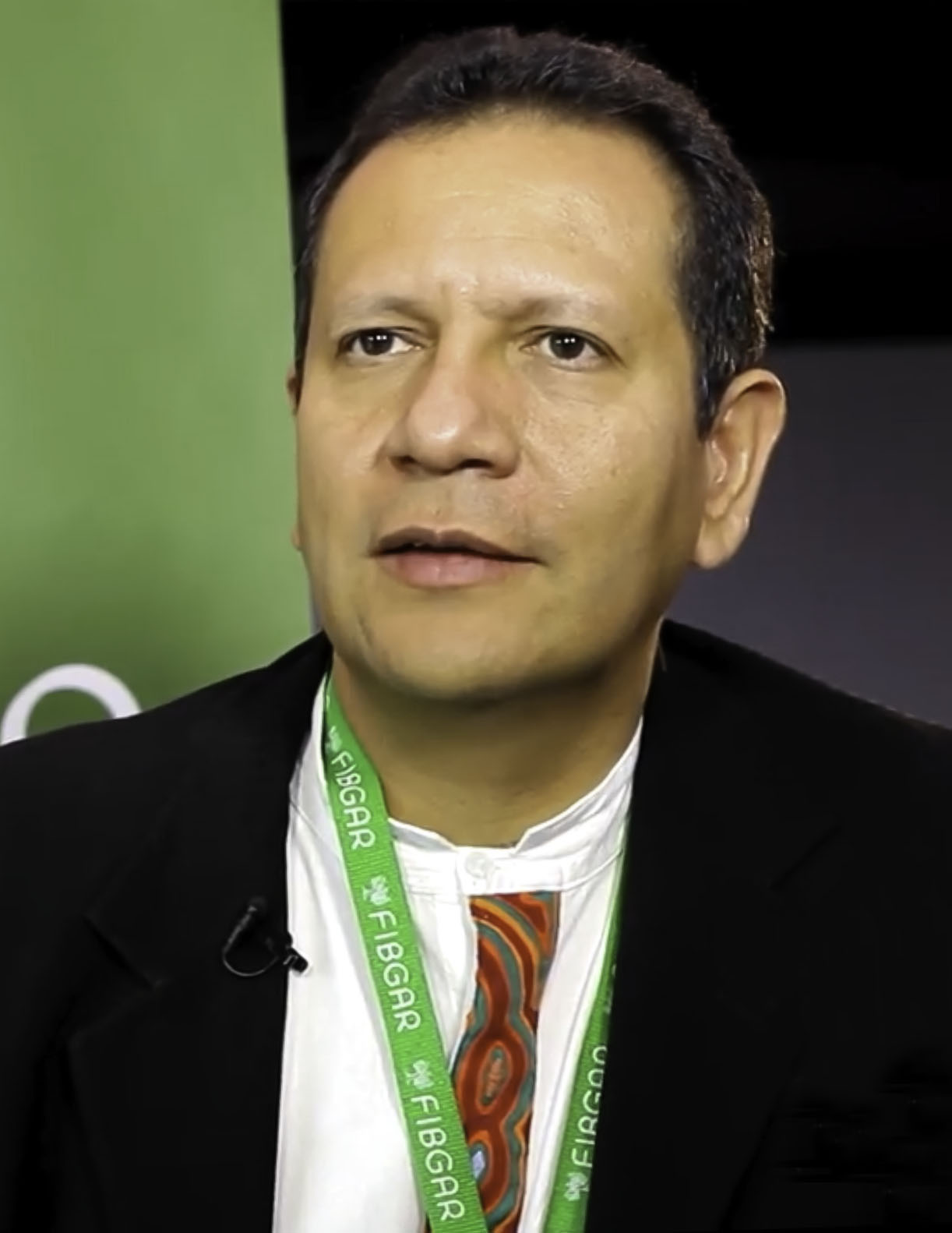

Logo General Secretary of FIDH for the Americas
- In office 2004–2026

Personal details
- Born: Luis Guillermo Pérez Casas Líbano, Tolima, Colombia
- Spouse: Linda (m. 2013)
- Education: National University of Colombia; Sciences Po Bordeaux; Institute for Higher Studies in Development; Institute of Political Studies, Brussels

Luis Guillermo Pérez Casas is a Colombian human rights lawyer who is currently serving as the General Secretary for the Americas for the International Federation for Human Rights. He has represented the Americas at the FIDH since 2004 and in May 2013 announced his candidacy to stand for the FIDH's presidency.

He is a lawyer with the José Alvear Restrepo Lawyer's Collective and sits on its general assembly.

== Early life and education ==
Pérez was born in Líbano in the Tolima department of Colombia's Andean Region. He gained his undergraduate degree from the National University of Colombia and has done graduate study at the Institute for Higher Studies in Development, External University of Colombia, and political science at Sciences Po Bordeaux and the Institute of Political Studies, Brussels.

== Career ==
Pérez joined the José Alvear Restrepo Lawyer's Collective (CAJAR) in 1987 and became the general secratry for the Americas region for International Federation for Human Rights (FIDH) in 2004. He has represented FIDH at the European Union in Brussels, the International Criminal Court in The Hague, the United Nations in Geneva and International Council at the World Social Forum. He was the executive Secretary of the Copenhagen Initiative for Central America and Mexico (CIFCA) for eight years, specializing in the areas of aid and development and the impact of free trade agreements on human rights.

He previously served on the Expert Committee of the Centre National de Coopération au Développement (CNCD) between 1997 and 1998 for the selection of project in Latin America. In April 2018 Pérez visited Europe, and in United Kingdom he submitted evidence of political murders that occurred in Colombia in 2017 to the International Criminal Court.

In academia, Pérez has taught General and Comparative Constitutional Law at the Graduate Department of the Escuela Superior de Administración Pública (ESAP), and Constitutional Law at the Academia Diplomática de San Carlos. He has also held a professorship at the Law Department of the Universidad Nacional de Colombia.

He has also served as a permanent commentator for the radio program “Radio Air Libre Bruselas” covering issues related to human rights in Latin America and has appeared on several other media outlets.
