= Isabel Bunch de Cortés =

Colombian writer, poet, and translator (1845–1921)

- Born: April 24, 1845; Pacho, Colombia
- Died: 1921 (76)
- Occupation(s): poet, writer, and translator

Isabel Bunch de Cortés (April 24, 1845 – 1921) was a Colombian writer, poet, and translator.

== Biography ==
Isabel Bunch was born in 1845 in Pacho, Colombia. Her father was the English banker and iron baron Robert Henry Bunch Woodside, a personal friend of Simón Bolívar. Her mother was Dolores Mutis Amaya, great-niece of the Spanish scientist José Celestino Mutis; Dolores' first husband was the French general Louis Peru de Lacroix.

In 1865, she married the businessman Enrique Cortés Niño.

Due to her privileged upbringing, Bunch de Cortés was given an education and traveled abroad, becoming well versed in English and French literature. She produced various translations into Spanish, which were published in magazines and newspapers. She also began writing poetry, which appeared in such publications as El Iris and La Patria, and she later produced works of fiction.

Bunch de Cortés was one of the first Colombian women to publish her work in periodicals. Her prolific writing often touched on themes of her hometown of Pacho, and on women's role in Colombian society. Her work was frequently published under the pseudonyms Belisa or Adah, as was typical at the time, since it was unusual for women to pursue careers as writers.

In 1921, while traveling to visit family in London, Isabel Bunch de Cortés died on the high seas at age 76.

A library in her hometown of Pacho, established in 2011, was named Biblioteca Pública Municipal Infantil Isabel Bunch de Cortés in her honor.
