= Diocese of Líbano–Honda =

Diocese of the Catholic Church in Colombia

Coordinates: 4.924°N 75.065°W

Diocese of Líbano–Honda Dioecesis Libanus-Hondanus

Catholic

Location
- Country: Colombia
- Ecclesiastical province: Ibagué

Statistics
- Area: 3,477 km^{2} (1,342 sq mi)
- Population: Total; Catholics: (as of 2004); 300,000; 250,000 (83.3%)

Information
- Rite: Latin Rite
- Established: 8 July 1989 (37 years ago)
- Cathedral: Catedral Nuestra Señora del Carmen, Líbano
- Co-cathedral: Co-catedral Nuestra Señora del Rosario, Honda

Current leadership
- Pope: Leo XIV
- Bishop: José Luis Henao Cadavid
- Metropolitan Archbishop: vacant

Map

Website
- Diócesis de Líbano-Honda

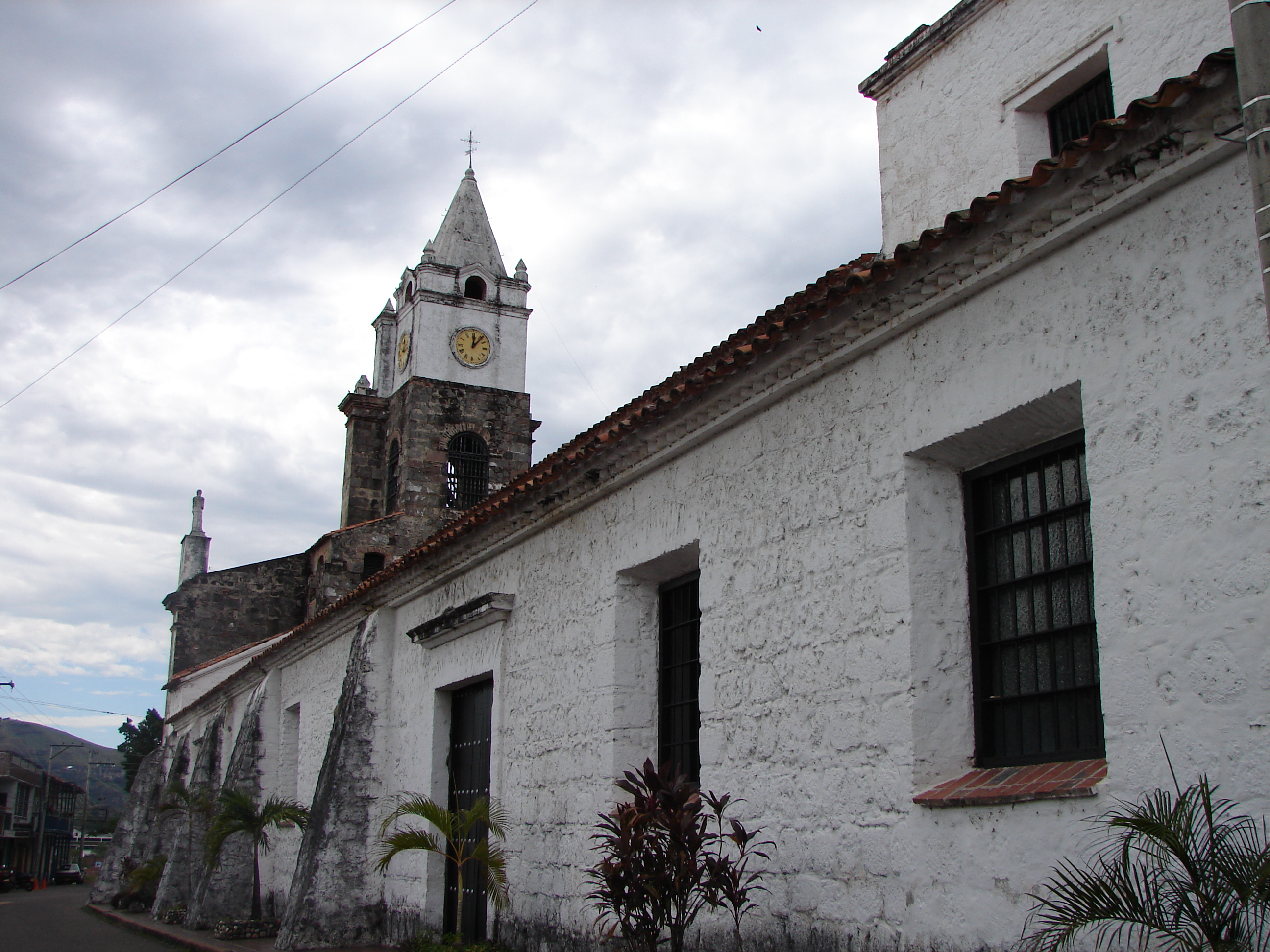
Co-cathedral of Our Lady of the Rosary

The Roman Catholic Diocese of Líbano–Honda (Latin: Libanus-Hondanus) is a diocese located in northern Tolima Department in Colombia, with sees in the cities of Líbano and Honda in the ecclesiastical province of Ibagué in Colombia.

== History ==
The Diocese of Líbano–Honda was erected from territory within the northern end of the Archdiocese of Ibagué on 8 July 1989.

== Ordinaries ==
- José Luis Serna Alzate, I.M.C. (8 July 1989 – 12 July 2002)
- Rafael Arcadio Bernal Supelano, C.Ss.R. (10 January 2003 – 28 February 2004)
- José Miguel Gómez Rodríguez (22 November 2004 – 23 February 2015), appointed Bishop of Facatativá
- José Luis Henao Cadavid (17 October 2015 – )

== See also ==
- Roman Catholicism in Colombia
