= Luis Antonio Nova Rocha =

- Bishop of Facatativá
- Church: Catholic Church
- Diocese: Diocese of Facatativá
- In office: 13 November 2010 – 9 April 2013
- Predecessor: Luis Gabriel Romero Franco
- Successor: José Miguel Gómez Rodríguez
- Previous posts: Titular Bishop of Equizetum (2002-2010); Auxiliary Bishop of Barranquilla (2002-2010)

Orders
- Ordination: 22 August 1968 by Pope Paul VI
- Consecration: 9 March 2002 by Luis Gabriel Romero Franco

Personal details
- Born: 30 July 1943 Subachoque, Cundinamarca Department, Colombia
- Died: 9 April 2013 (aged 69)

Luis Antonio Nova Rocha (30 July 1943 – 9 April 2013) was the Roman Catholic bishop of the Diocese of Facatativá, Colombia.

Ordained in 1968, Nova Rocha was named bishop in 2002 and died while still in office.
