= Free State of Mariquita =

Free State of Mariquita Estado Libre de Mariquita (Spanish)
- 1814–1816
- Flag Coat of arms

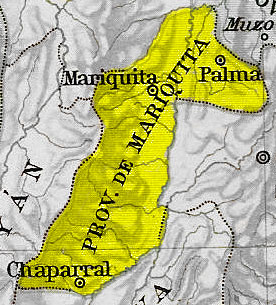
- The Free State of Mariquita in 1814
- Capital: Mariquita
- Common languages: Spanish
- Religion: Roman Catholicism
- Demonym(s): Mariquiteñ(o/a), Neogranadin(o/a)
- President
  - 1814–1816: José León Armero Racines
- Historical era: Colombian War of Independence
  - Declaration of independence: December 22 1814
  - Constitution enacted: March 3, 1815
  - Spanish Reconquest: July 12 1816
Preceded by	Succeeded by
Mariquita Province	Mariquita Province
- Today part of: Colombia

The Free State of Mariquita was an administrative and territorial entity of the United Provinces of New Granada. It encompassed the territory of its namesake New Granadian province as it existed in 1810.

== History ==
Between 1807 and 1808, French forces under the command of Napoleon Bonaparte invaded Spain and placed Napoleon's brother, Joseph Bonaparte, on the throne. The Spanish colonies in the Americas took advantage of the chaos of the ensuing 1808–1814 war of independence on the Iberian Peninsula to assert their own right to self-governance.
