= Supatá golden frog =

Scientific classification
- Domain: Eukaryota
- Kingdom: Animalia
- Phylum: Chordata
- Class: Amphibia
- Order: Anura
- Family: Dendrobatidae
- Subfamily: Dendrobatinae
- Genus: Ranitomeya
- Species: R. sp. nov. "Supatáe"

Binomial name
- Ranitomeya sp. nov. "Supatáe"

Species of amphibian

The Supatá golden frog (Ranitomeya sp. nov. "Supatáe") is a species of poison dart frog endemic to Colombia. It was discovered in 2007.

== Description ==
The frog is 0.8 inches (2.0 cm) long.

== Etymology and habitat ==
The Supatá golden frog has been named after the municipality of Supatá, homeland of the pre-Columbian Panche people. In Chibcha supatá means "low and fertile land" It is only found in a 20-hectare (49-acre) section of the Cundinamarca Department of Colombia.
