= Cundinamarca Department (1824) =

Cundinamarca Department was one of the departments of Gran Colombia.

== Provinces ==
- Bogotá Province. Capital: Bogotá. Cantones: Bogotá, Funza, Guaduas, Mesa, Tocaima, Ubaté y Zipaquirá.
- Antioquia Province. Capital: Santa Fe de Antioquia. Cantones: Antioquia, Cáceres, Medellín, Rionegro, Santa Rosa, Santo Domingo y Zaragoza.
- Mariquita Province. Capital: Mariquita. Cantones: Mariquita, Honda, Ibagué y La Palma.
- Neiva Province. Capital: Neiva. Cantones: Neiva, La Plata, Purificación y Timaná.

== See also ==
- Cundinamarca Department (1820)
- Cundinamarca Department
