= Líbano, Tolima =

- Municipality
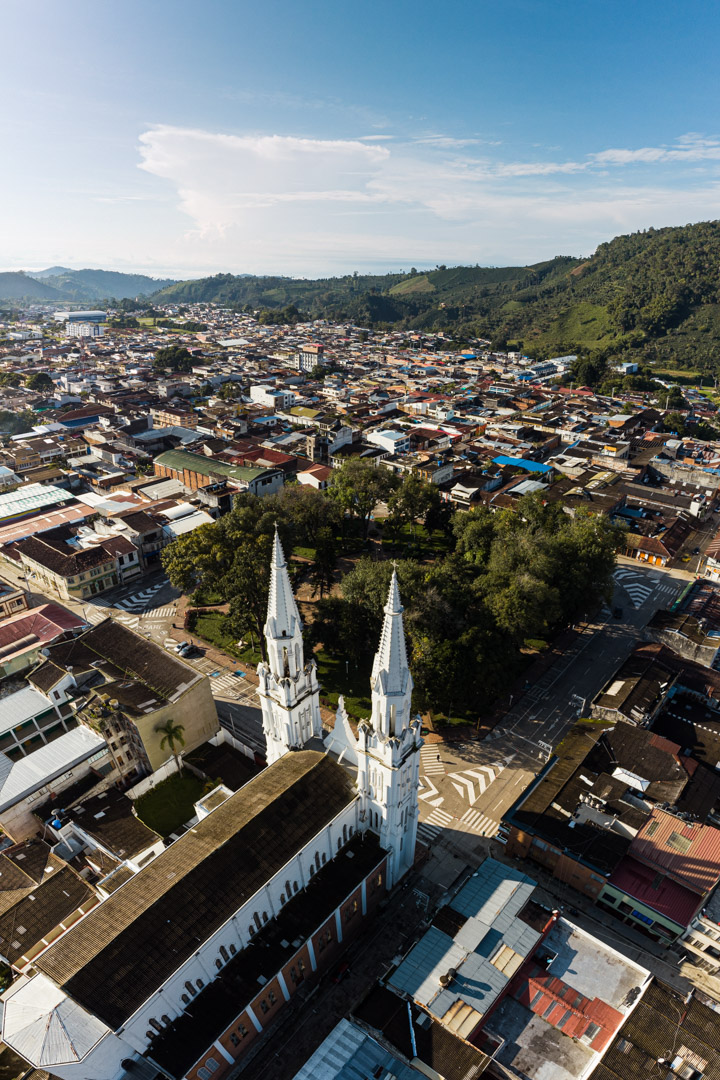
- Panoramic photo of Líbano.

- Flag Coat of arms

- Location of the municipality and town of Líbano, Tolima in the Tolima Department of Colombia.
- Coordinates: 4°55′N 75°10′W
- Country: Colombia
- Department: Tolima Department
- Established: 23 April 1849

Government
  - Alcalde (Mayor): Beatriz Valencia Gómez (2024-2027)

Area
  - Municipality: 282.4 km^{2} (109.0 sq mi)
  - Urban: 3.64 km^{2} (1.41 sq mi)
- Elevation: 1,565 m (5,135 ft)

Population (2020 est.)
  - Municipality: 36,231
  - Density: 128.3/km^{2} (332.3/sq mi)
  - Urban: 23,290
  - Urban density: 6,400/km^{2} (16,600/sq mi)
- Time zone: UTC-5 (Colombia Standard Time)
- Website: http://www.libano-tolima.gov.co

Líbano is a town and municipality in the Tolima department of Colombia. The population of the municipality was estimated at 36,231 as of 2020. Along with Honda, Líbano is the seat of the Roman Catholic Diocese of Líbano–Honda.

== History ==
Before the arrival of Europeans, the Panches, Pantagoras, Bledos, and Marquetones lived in the region. They were among the tribes most feared by the Muisca. Their society was an aristocratic hierarchy headed by a chief.

By the mid-nineteenth century, settlers from Antioquia explored south in search of vacant land, and mines, to be acquired by degrees of effort and incorporated into the national economy. A caravan of Antioqueños led by Isidro Parra, found a valley planted with cedars and oaks, and constructed a few huts. The hamlet was named Líbano, the Spanish word for Lebanon.

The layout of the built-up area of Líbano was organized as a village in 1886. Since 1900, Líbano developed as an important village, pushing dirt roads in all directions. Socio-economic development of the region was guided by its founders from the development of mining and power to the cultivation of coffee, which has become the main characteristic element of the economy, society and culture of the area.

The city of Líbano is the see of the Diocese of Líbano-Honda, created by Pope John Paul II on July 26, 1989, by the Bull "Ita Iam." The territorial area of the diocese covers an area of 3,477 km ² with approximately 240,000 inhabitants. Its first bishop was Monsignor José Luis Serna Alzate, who took office on October 7, 1989. On 5 December 2015, José Luis Henao Cadavid was installed as the fourth bishop of the diocese.

== Geography ==
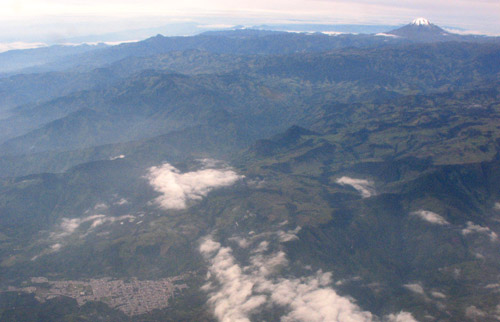
Aerial view of Líbano with Nevado del Tolima in the background.

The municipality of Líbano is located in the north of the department of Tolima, about 56 kilometres (35 miles) north of Ibagué, the departmental capital. Líbano is bordered to the north by the municipalities of Armero and Villahermosa, to the West by the municipality of Murillo, to the East by the municipality of Lérida and to the south by Santa Isabel and Venadillo.

Líbano is located in the Cordillera Central, east of Nevado del Ruiz. The town is at an altitude of 1,565 metres (5,135 ft) above sea level, putting it in the tierra templada, or temperate zone, of Colombia. The area is hilly and heavily forested where it is not used for agriculture. Agriculture in the area includes growing of coffee, bananas, plantains, and beans.

== History ==
El Libano is a historic coffee producing municipality in Tolima. There, there are 77 villages and 3,980 families that make their living by planting coffee.

His production has also been recognized in various competitions such as the Master of Coffee Colombia, where the farmer Ómar Arango was recognized for the high quality of his coffee in 2019.

Also, the specialty coffees that come out of this municipality are exported to countries such as China, Japan, Korea, the United States, Spain, and England, among others.

In addition, it could be said that this is the municipality with the longest coffee history in Tolima, In the 1900s it had threshing machines that were headquarters of important companies in Europe, they were called “threshers”.

== Notable people ==
- Luis Guillermo Pérez, human rights lawyer

== Climate ==
Climate data for Líbano (Trinidad La), elevation 1,430 m (4,690 ft), (1971–2000)
Month	Jan	Feb	Mar	Apr	May	Jun	Jul	Aug	Sep	Oct	Nov	Dec	Year
Mean daily maximum °C (°F)	24.3 (75.7)	24.4 (75.9)	24.6 (76.3)	23.9 (75.0)	23.7 (74.7)	24.0 (75.2)	24.8 (76.6)	25.3 (77.5)	24.8 (76.6)	23.6 (74.5)	23.8 (74.8)	23.9 (75.0)	24.3 (75.7)
Daily mean °C (°F)	19.8 (67.6)	19.9 (67.8)	20.2 (68.4)	20.0 (68.0)	20.0 (68.0)	19.9 (67.8)	20.1 (68.2)	20.4 (68.7)	20.1 (68.2)	19.5 (67.1)	19.6 (67.3)	19.6 (67.3)	19.9 (67.8)
Mean daily minimum °C (°F)	16.0 (60.8)	16.2 (61.2)	16.5 (61.7)	16.6 (61.9)	16.5 (61.7)	16.0 (60.8)	15.4 (59.7)	15.6 (60.1)	15.9 (60.6)	16.1 (61.0)	16.2 (61.2)	15.9 (60.6)	16.1 (61.0)
Average precipitation mm (inches)	120.4 (4.74)	129.0 (5.08)	180.1 (7.09)	244.1 (9.61)	260.9 (10.27)	133.6 (5.26)	82.6 (3.25)	117.7 (4.63)	227.1 (8.94)	292.0 (11.50)	205.0 (8.07)	128.3 (5.05)	2,120.8 (83.50)
Average precipitation days	13	15	18	22	20	14	11	13	17	23	20	16	202
Average relative humidity (%)	83	82	82	86	87	82	75	73	79	86	87	85	82
Mean monthly sunshine hours	139.5	104.6	105.4	93.0	111.6	147.0	186.0	186.0	153.0	105.4	105.0	124.0	1,560.5
Mean daily sunshine hours	4.5	3.7	3.4	3.1	3.6	4.9	6.0	6.0	5.1	3.4	3.5	4.0	4.3
Source: Instituto de Hidrologia Meteorologia y Estudios Ambientales
