= Honda, Tolima =

Coordinates: 5°12′15″N 74°44′30″W

Honda
- Municipality and town
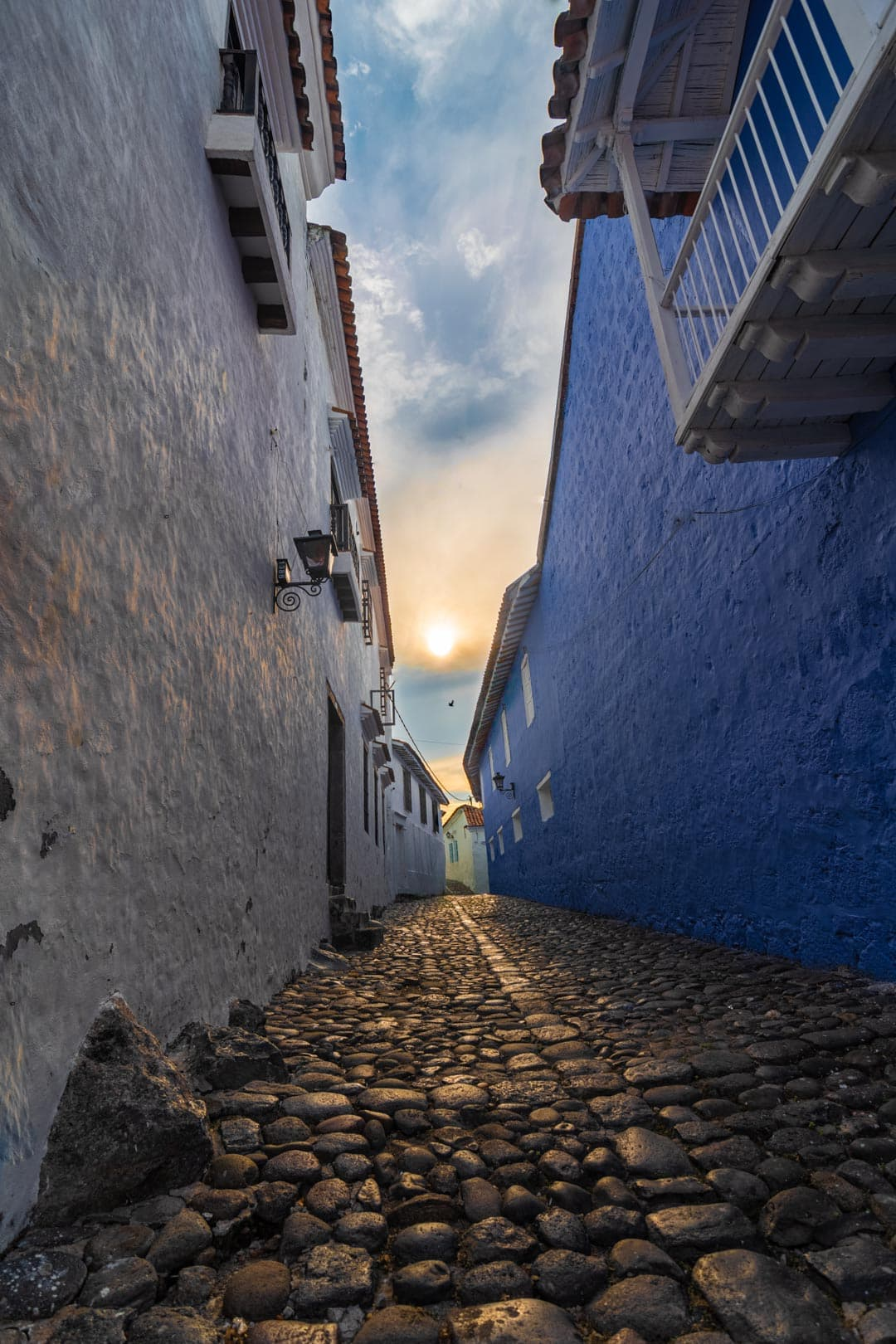
- Most popular street in Honda (Calle de las trampas)

- Flag Coat of arms
- Nickname: "The Bridge City"
- Location of the municipality and town of Honda in Tolima Department.
- Country: Colombia
- Department: Tolima

Government
  - Mayor: Alberto Arce Camacho

Area
  - Municipality and town: 304.9 km^{2} (117.7 sq mi)
  - Urban: 10.15 km^{2} (3.92 sq mi)
- Elevation: 229 m (751 ft)

Population (2018 census)
  - Municipality and town: 24,693
  - Density: 80.99/km^{2} (209.8/sq mi)
  - Urban: 23,658
  - Urban density: 2,331/km^{2} (6,037/sq mi)
- Time zone: UTC-5

Honda (IPA: [onda]) is a town and municipality in the Tolima department of Colombia. The population of the municipality was 24,693 as of the census 2018. Along with Líbano, Honda is the seat of the Roman Catholic Diocese of Líbano-Honda. The main industries of Honda are tourism, fishing, and cattle-ranching.

== Toponymy (name origin) ==
Honda takes its name from the Ondaimas, the indigenous people that inhabited the banks of the Magdalena River and the region where the city lies today.

Honda is called "the City of Bridges" with more than 40 of them on the rivers Magdalena, Gualí, Guarinó, and Quebrada Seca. It is also called the "City of Peace" as it escaped most of the violence of the 1950s.

== History ==
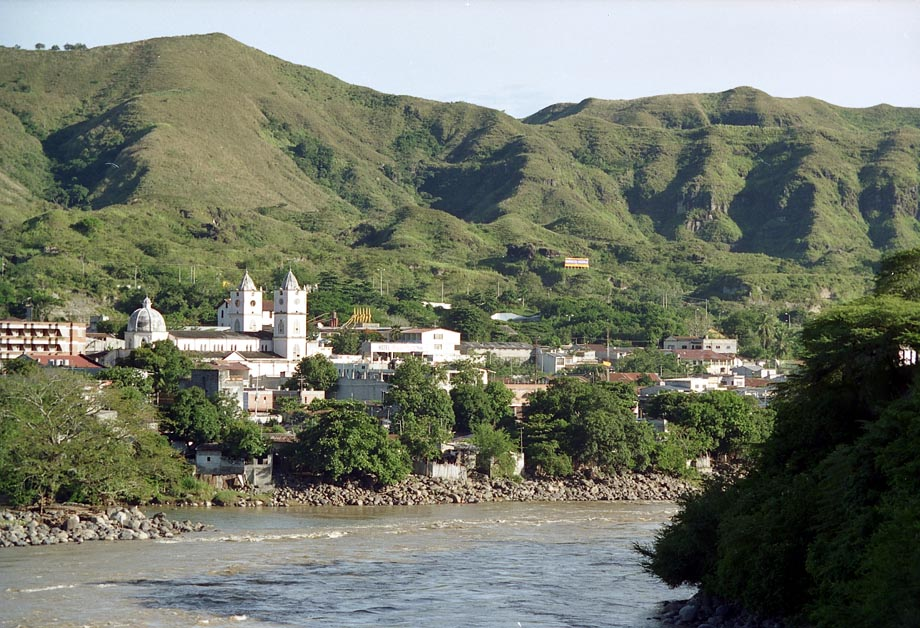
Honda and the Magdalena in the foreground

Honda was founded on August 24, 1539 by Francisco Nuñez Pedroso. The "golden age" of the city was between 1850 and 1910 when the Magdalena river constituted the only means of transportation between the Caribbean coast and the inland city of Bogotá. The city was the main river port of the country and all the imported goods and articles arrived in Bogotá through the port of Honda.

Because of its historical importance, Honda was named a Pueblo Patrimonio (heritage town) of Colombia in 2010. As of March 2021, it is the only municipality in the Middle Magdalena Valley region that has been awarded this distinction.

== Climate ==
Climate data for Honda (Esperanza La), elevation 222 m (728 ft), (1981–2010)
Month	Jan	Feb	Mar	Apr	May	Jun	Jul	Aug	Sep	Oct	Nov	Dec	Year
Mean daily maximum °C (°F)	33.0 (91.4)	33.2 (91.8)	33.1 (91.6)	32.7 (90.9)	32.7 (90.9)	33.6 (92.5)	34.9 (94.8)	35.5 (95.9)	34.2 (93.6)	32.4 (90.3)	32.0 (89.6)	32.3 (90.1)	33.3 (91.9)
Daily mean °C (°F)	27.5 (81.5)	27.8 (82.0)	27.7 (81.9)	27.4 (81.3)	27.4 (81.3)	27.7 (81.9)	28.6 (83.5)	29.1 (84.4)	28.5 (83.3)	27.4 (81.3)	27.0 (80.6)	27.3 (81.1)	27.7 (81.9)
Mean daily minimum °C (°F)	22.1 (71.8)	22.2 (72.0)	22.4 (72.3)	22.5 (72.5)	22.5 (72.5)	22.4 (72.3)	21.9 (71.4)	22.2 (72.0)	22.2 (72.0)	22.1 (71.8)	22.1 (71.8)	22.4 (72.3)	22.2 (72.0)
Average precipitation mm (inches)	51.2 (2.02)	75.3 (2.96)	117.9 (4.64)	194.8 (7.67)	178.1 (7.01)	71.1 (2.80)	57.3 (2.26)	74.8 (2.94)	140.2 (5.52)	214.1 (8.43)	211.1 (8.31)	112.6 (4.43)	1,498.5 (59.00)
Average precipitation days	8	9	12	17	17	10	9	10	14	19	17	12	154
Average relative humidity (%)	76	75	76	79	78	73	67	65	71	78	80	80	75
Mean monthly sunshine hours	201.5	166.6	151.9	147.0	176.7	180.0	207.7	204.6	180.0	173.6	174.0	189.1	2,152.7
Mean daily sunshine hours	6.5	5.9	4.9	4.9	5.7	6.0	6.7	6.6	6.0	5.6	5.8	6.1	5.9
Source: Instituto de Hidrologia Meteorologia y Estudios Ambientales
