= Cundinamarca Department (1819) =

Department of Gran Colombia

Cundinamarca was one of the three departments of Gran Colombia created in 1819.

== Overview ==
In the southwest it bordered the Department of Quito, and in the east, the Department of Venezuela.

From 1824 onward the name was used for the Department of Cundinamarca of the Centro District of Gran Colombia.

== See also ==
- Cundinamarca Department (1824)
- Cundinamarca Department (1886–present)
