= Quito Department =

Location of Quito Department in Gran Colombia

Quito Department was one of the three departments of Gran Colombia established in 1819. It bordered Cundinamarca Department to the east.
