= Tobía =

- Municipality
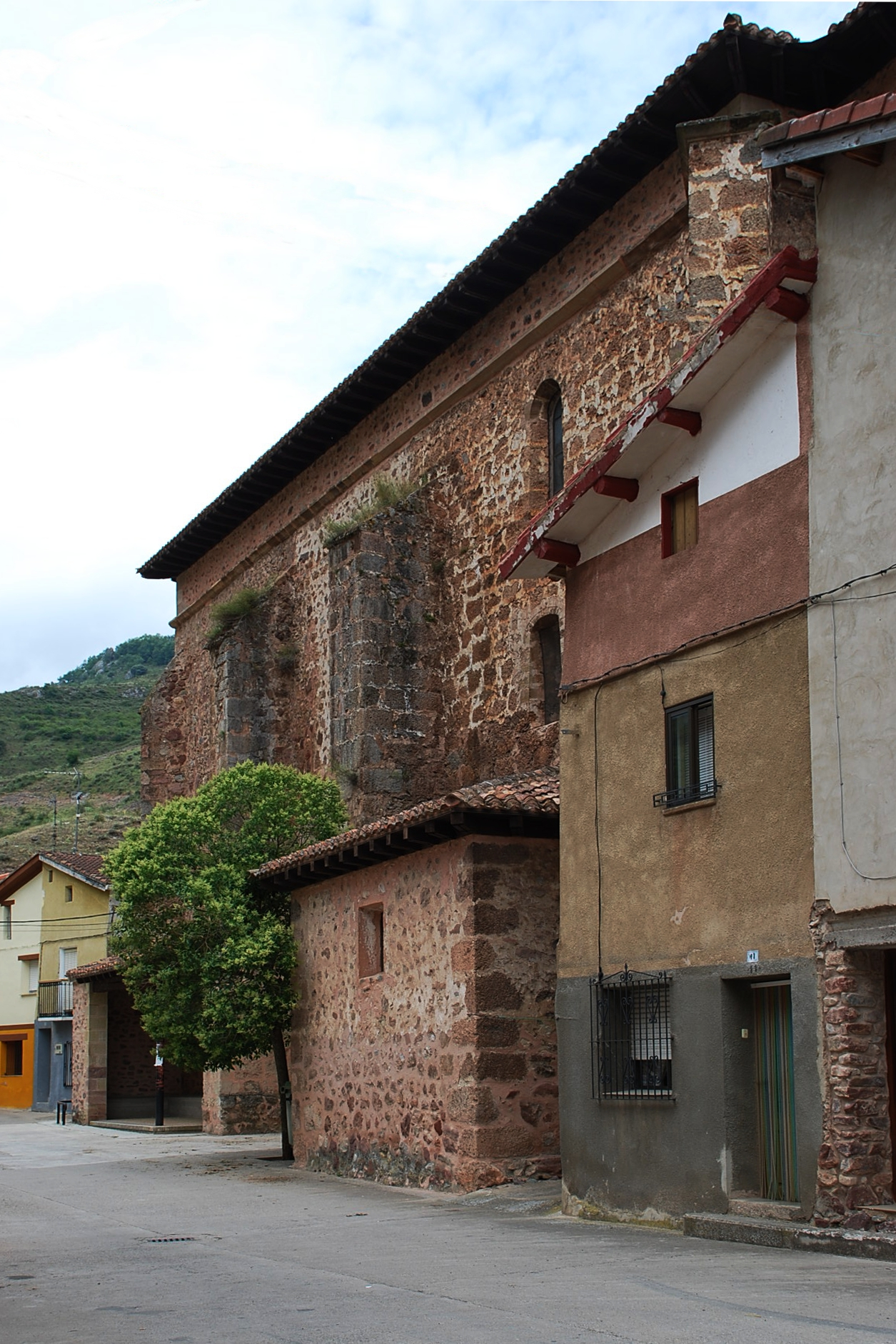
- Street of Tobía

- Location within La Rioja, Spain Location within Spain
- Coordinates: 42°17′53″N 2°48′55″W
- Country: Spain
- Autonomous community: La Rioja
- Comarca: Anguiano

Government
  - Mayor: Jacinto Rodríguez Gómez (PP)

Area
  - Total: 34.94 km^{2} (13.49 sq mi)
- Elevation: 688 m (2,257 ft)

Population (2025-01-01)
  - Total: 41
- Demonym(s): tobiano, na
- Postal code: 26321
- Website: https://www.tobia.es

Tobía (Spanish pronunciation: [toˈβi.a]) is a village in the province and autonomous community of La Rioja, Spain. The municipality covers an area of 34.94 square kilometres (13.49 sq mi) and as of 2011 had a population of 72 people.
