= San Francisco, Cundinamarca =

Coordinates: 4°58′16″N 74°17′21″W

San Francisco
- Municipality and town
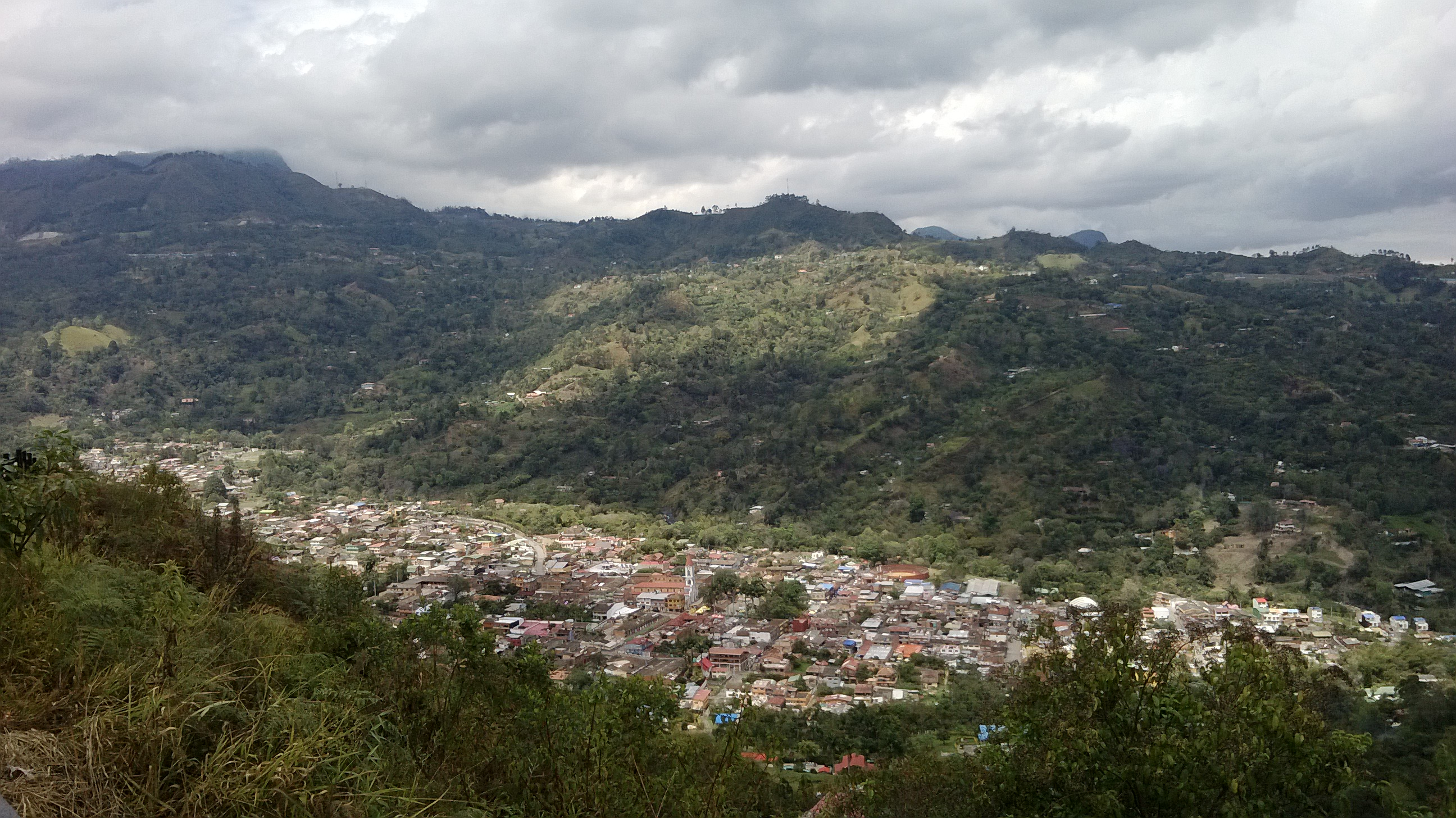

- Flag Coat of arms
- Motto: Manos a la obra
- Location of San Francisco in Cundinamarca
- Country: Colombia
- Department: Cundinamarca
- Region: Gualivá Province
- Foundation: 22 de noviembre de 1857

Government
  - Mayor: Martha Libia Gaitán González,

Area
  - Municipality and town: 118 km^{2} (46 sq mi)
- Elevation: 1,520 m (4,990 ft)

Population (2005)
  - Municipality and town: 8,187
  - Density: 69.4/km^{2} (180/sq mi)
  - Urban: 2,851
- Time zone: UTC-5
- Area code: 57 + 1
- Website: Official Site (in Spanish)

San Francisco de Sales, commonly known as San Francisco (Spanish pronunciation: [saɱ‿fɾanˈsisko]), is a municipality and town of Colombia in the department of Cundinamarca.

== Geography ==
San Francisco de Sales is bounded on the north by the municipality of Supatá, the west by La Vega, on the south by Facatativá, to the southeast by El Rosal, and on the east by Subachoque. The town of San Francisco has about one-third the population of the municipality, with the rest living in the rural districts of Arrayán, El Peñón, Juan de Vera, La Laja, Muña, Pueblo Viejo, Sabaneta, San Antonio, San Miguel, and Tóriba.

The municipality is within temperate and cold climatic zones, and has a geomorphology of moorland (páramo bajo). The municipality has an average temperature of 20 °C (68 °F) in most of the territory, with an average annual rainfall of 1.493 metres (58.8 in). It is located 52 kilometres (32 mi) away from Bogotá; this distance, with its climate, scenery, water resources and other features make it attractive for tourism.

San Francisco is in the Diocese of Facatativá.

== History ==
The area was inhabited by the Panches, part of the Carib family, and Muisca, part of the Chibcha family. The Muisca lived in the southeastern part of the current municipality where it borders the municipality of El Rosal, where they established a fort to prevent access of the Panche Nation to the Confederation of Bacatá, whose sovereign was the Zipa and was located in the Sabana de Bogota.

In the colonial period, because the foundation of the municipality of Tenjo, six encomiendas were created, to which the indigenous people of that area were assigned. One of the encomiendas in the vicinity of Subachoque, was assigned to the Spanish citizen Don Juan de Vera, who named his property "Chinga Fría"; in Mexican Spanish chinga means "fuck", and in the Chibcha language means "wildness" or "bravery".

Then, between 1605 and when the neighboring town of La Vega was founded, Don Juan de Vera exchanged his encomienda "Chinga Fría" for another property. This new encomienda was named San José de Chinga Caliente; San José to give it a Christian name, and hot to distinguish it from the previous one in a colder area. Later, around 1750, these lands were acquired by Pedro Pulido, from the municipality of Tenjo. In 1828, Francisca Sánchez, from Tabio, bought the hacienda San José de Chinga Caliente from Pulido. Francisca Sánchez married the French citizen Francisco Convers in 1833. After 1850, the couple built the house that would later be called La Carlina, because the mansion of the encomienda was extremely run down.

At the time, the population of the region was about eight hundred thousand. The exploitation of virgin forests rewarded their efforts and gave some a comfortable existence. The growing population of the region felt the need to create an urban center to consolidate the civil authorities to solve the issues caused by the great travel distance to La Vega.

In 1855 Father Santos Maria Camero was appointed parish priest of La Vega. Days after his inauguration, he was invited to Chinga Caliente to provide the last rites to a dying man. Coming from La Vega, as he came over the pass, he was delighted with the beautiful plain that opened before his eyes. He was briefed about the feelings of the people of the area, then he asked Francisca Sanchez de Convers to donate a property to the Church where he wanted to build a village to serve as the center to a parish. She agreed. By 1856, Father Santos directed the subdivision of 41 lots on the bridle path leading to the mountains of Yaque, where 20 thatched houses were built with clay tile and dirt floors. On January 29, 1857, a commission headed by Pío Molano, the priest of Funza, and the mayor of La Vega, came to this village with the aim of studying elevating the village to a municipality. The commission met Francisco Convers and Francisca Sanchez, and other notables of the village. The coincidence of this being the date on which the Church celebrates the feast of St. Francis de Sales, the owners of the land being named Francisca and Francisco was much discussed and celebrated by those present, who agreed that the community would be called San Francisco de Sales and the parish would have the saint as its patron saint.

On receiving the report, the Archbishop of Bogota created the parish by episcopal decree on August 15, 1857; naming Father Santos Maria Camero as pastor. The priest, advised by his parishioners, presented a draft constitution for a new municipality to the Assembly of the State of Cundinamarca. The Cundinamarca State Assembly discussed the draft and on November 21, 1857, approved it, erecting a new municipality in the Department of Zipaquira, between the municipalities of Subachoque and La Vega, called San Francisco, and ordered expanding the land of the village to nine hectares. The Assembly also ordered the construction of public offices and jail, in order to appoint civil authorities. Political persecution due to the civil war that erupted in 1859, made the Lady Frances sell the hacienda to Dr. Senen Gutiérrez Castillo of San Juan de Rioseco, who, on February 2, 1873, delivered the nine hectares ordered by the Assembly of Cundinamarca in 1857 to Fray Blas Lombana.

In 1884, the first "mixed" school was founded. In 1895, Mayor Rogelio Alvarado and the priest Florentino Sarmiento established a Post & Telegraph office.

In the early twentieth century, the Hacienda San Jose de Chinga Caliente passed into the hands of Ricardo Jaramillo and his wife Carlina, who changed the name of the estate to Hacienda La Carlina. This farm was later acquired by Dr. Samuel Hoyos Arango, a native of Caldas.

In 1928 the first power plant, owned by Don Jose de la Cruz Florez was established in the Quinta de San Luis, three kilometers northwest of town. Various problems shut down the first power plant and the population was deprived of service for several years until 1948 the Jorge Escallón and Jacobo Flórez inaugurated a new plant on the right bank of the San Miguel River, adjoining the bridge of the road leading to Supatá.

The current parish church and the rectory were built between 1943 and 1953, while Father José Arquímedes Castro was the town priest.

In 1935, Eduardo and Hernando Luque, sons of General Silvestre Luque, founded the first boys' school, which soon became the parish school, and was eventually named "Colegio Divino Niño". In mid-1935, Father Joaquín Luna Serrano founded the Farm School for Poor Children. In 1943, Esther Melo and her daughter Anita founded the first girls' school, "El Perpetuo Socorro". It was also renamed "Colegio Divino Niño". In 1965, Father Francisco Jimenez transferred the parish schools to the Department of Cundinamarca. The girls' and boys' schools were united and renamed "Colegio Departamental Integrado Divino Niño" (Divine Child Integrated Departmental School).

== Tourism ==
San Francisco is home to El Jardin Encantado, a hummingbird sanctuary and tourist attraction.

== Climate ==
Climate data for San Francisco (Sabaneta), elevation 2,475 m (8,120 ft), (1981–2010)
Month	Jan	Feb	Mar	Apr	May	Jun	Jul	Aug	Sep	Oct	Nov	Dec	Year
Mean daily maximum °C (°F)	17.7 (63.9)	17.7 (63.9)	17.5 (63.5)	17.9 (64.2)	18.2 (64.8)	18.1 (64.6)	17.8 (64.0)	17.9 (64.2)	18.1 (64.6)	17.8 (64.0)	17.4 (63.3)	17.2 (63.0)	17.8 (64.0)
Daily mean °C (°F)	13.2 (55.8)	13.5 (56.3)	13.5 (56.3)	14.0 (57.2)	14.2 (57.6)	14.1 (57.4)	13.7 (56.7)	13.7 (56.7)	13.8 (56.8)	13.6 (56.5)	13.5 (56.3)	13.3 (55.9)	13.7 (56.7)
Mean daily minimum °C (°F)	9.2 (48.6)	9.6 (49.3)	9.9 (49.8)	10.3 (50.5)	10.4 (50.7)	10.1 (50.2)	9.8 (49.6)	9.8 (49.6)	9.7 (49.5)	9.8 (49.6)	9.8 (49.6)	9.4 (48.9)	9.8 (49.6)
Average precipitation mm (inches)	86.1 (3.39)	123.9 (4.88)	176.3 (6.94)	152.6 (6.01)	114.9 (4.52)	61.2 (2.41)	52.8 (2.08)	55.9 (2.20)	76.5 (3.01)	175.9 (6.93)	218.3 (8.59)	161.7 (6.37)	1,411.9 (55.59)
Average precipitation days	17	16	21	22	22	19	19	20	18	22	23	20	232
Average relative humidity (%)	87	88	89	89	88	86	85	85	86	87	89	88	87
Mean monthly sunshine hours	136.4	118.6	105.4	96.0	111.6	123.0	139.5	142.6	123.0	111.6	105.0	117.8	1,430.5
Mean daily sunshine hours	4.4	4.2	3.4	3.2	3.6	4.1	4.5	4.6	4.1	3.6	3.5	3.8	3.9
Source: Instituto de Hidrologia Meteorologia y Estudios Ambientales

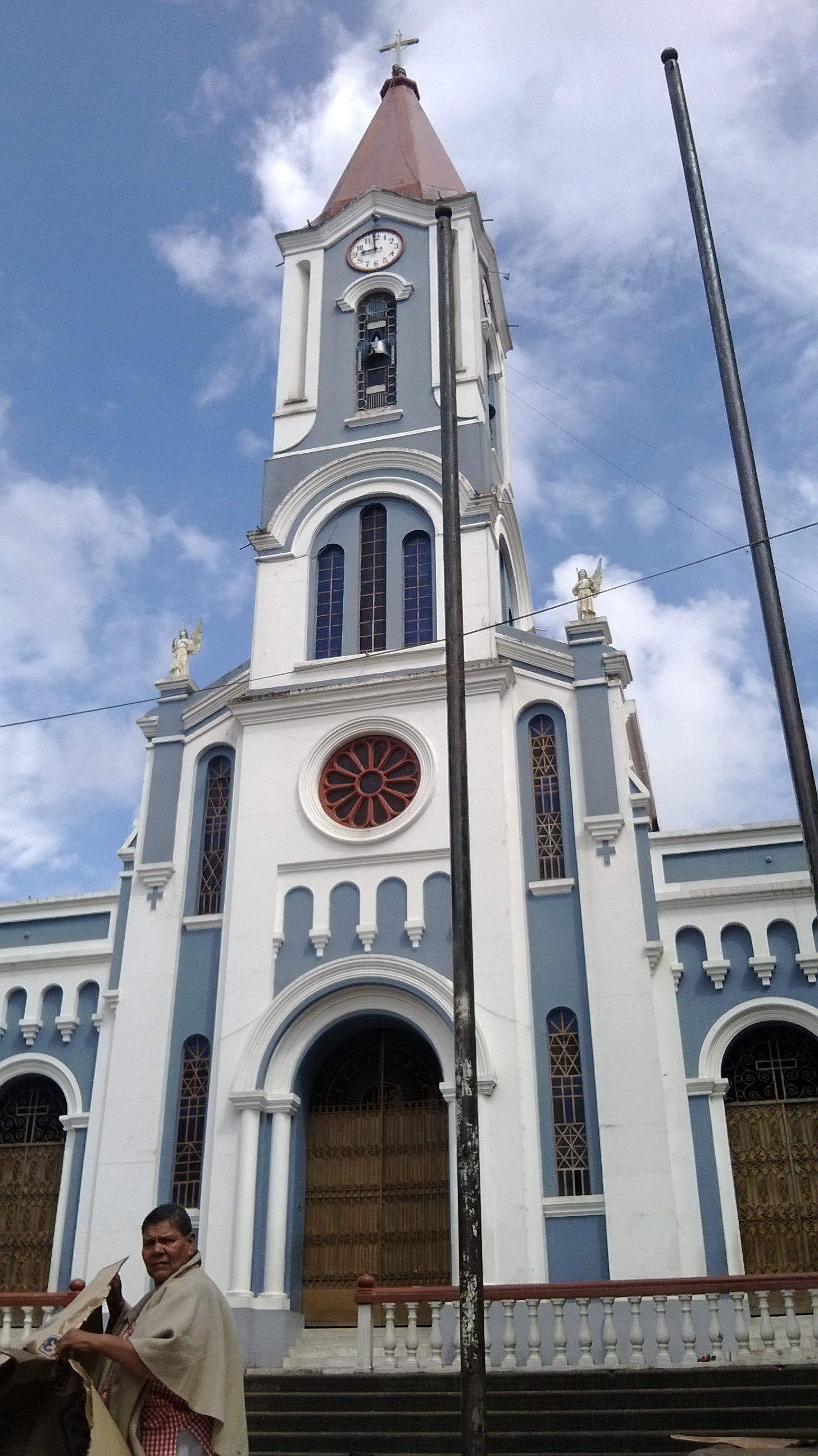
Parish church in the center of San Francisco de Sales

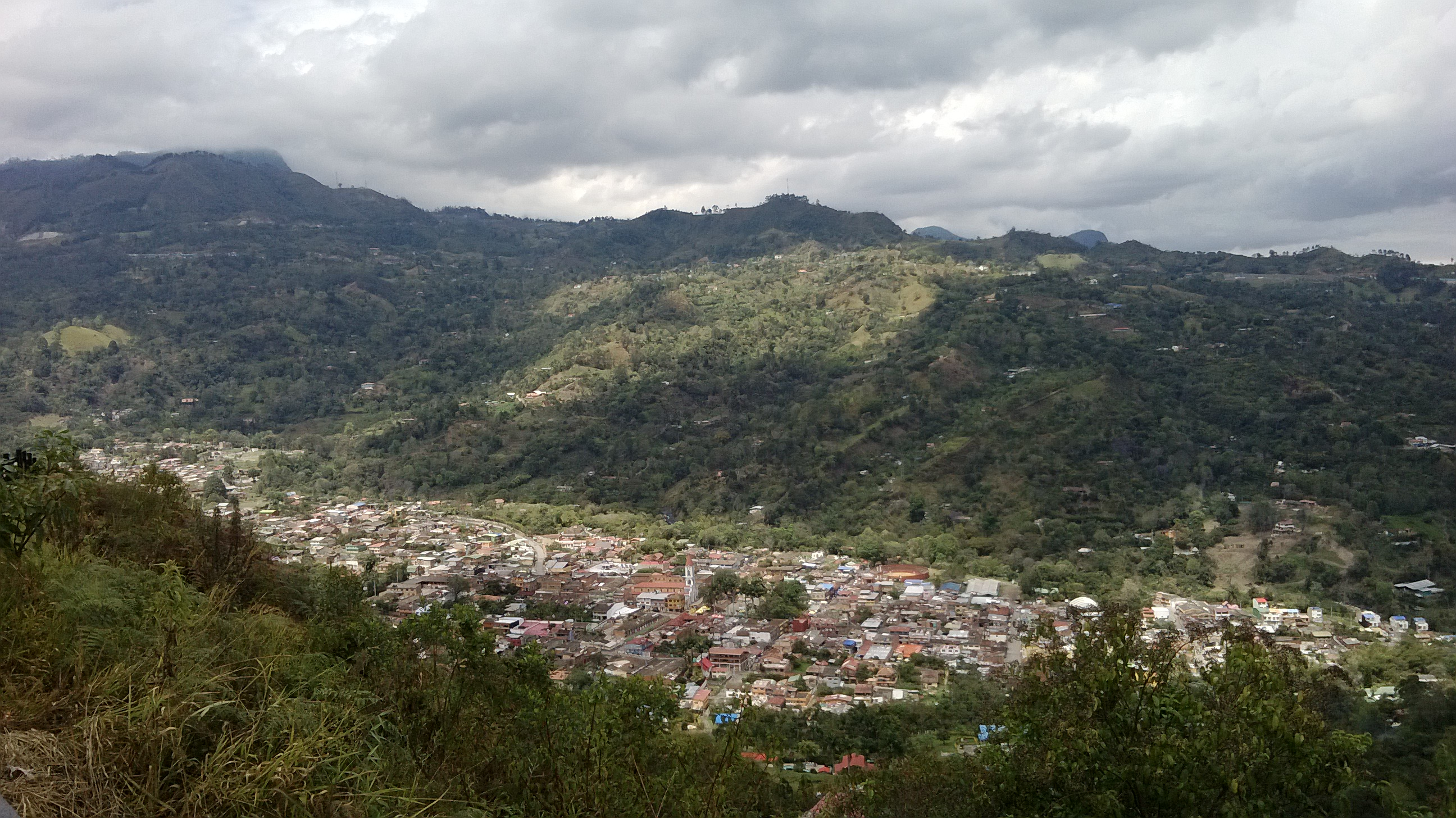
San Francisco de Sales. View from a hill

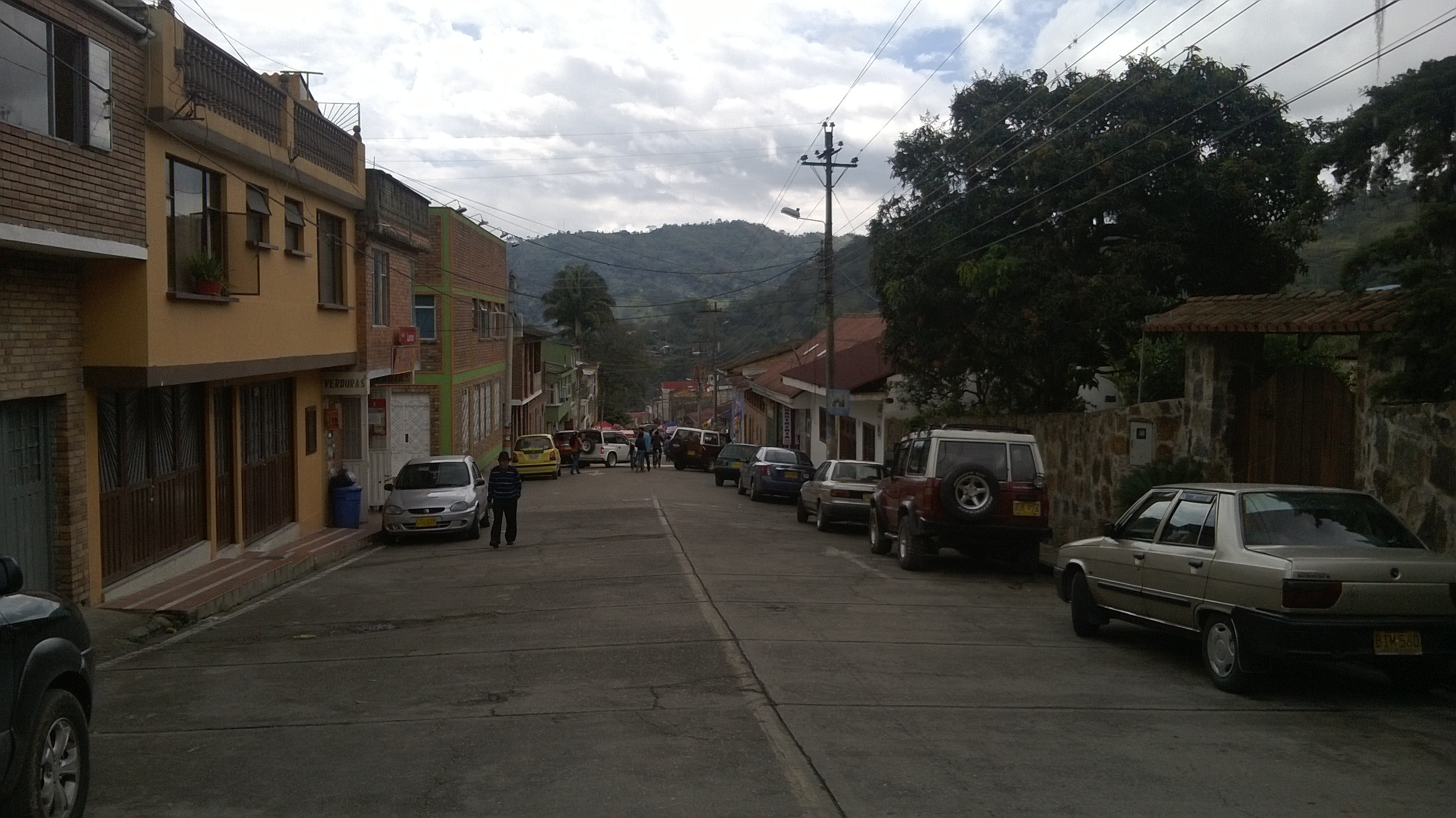
A street near the center of San Francisco de Sales

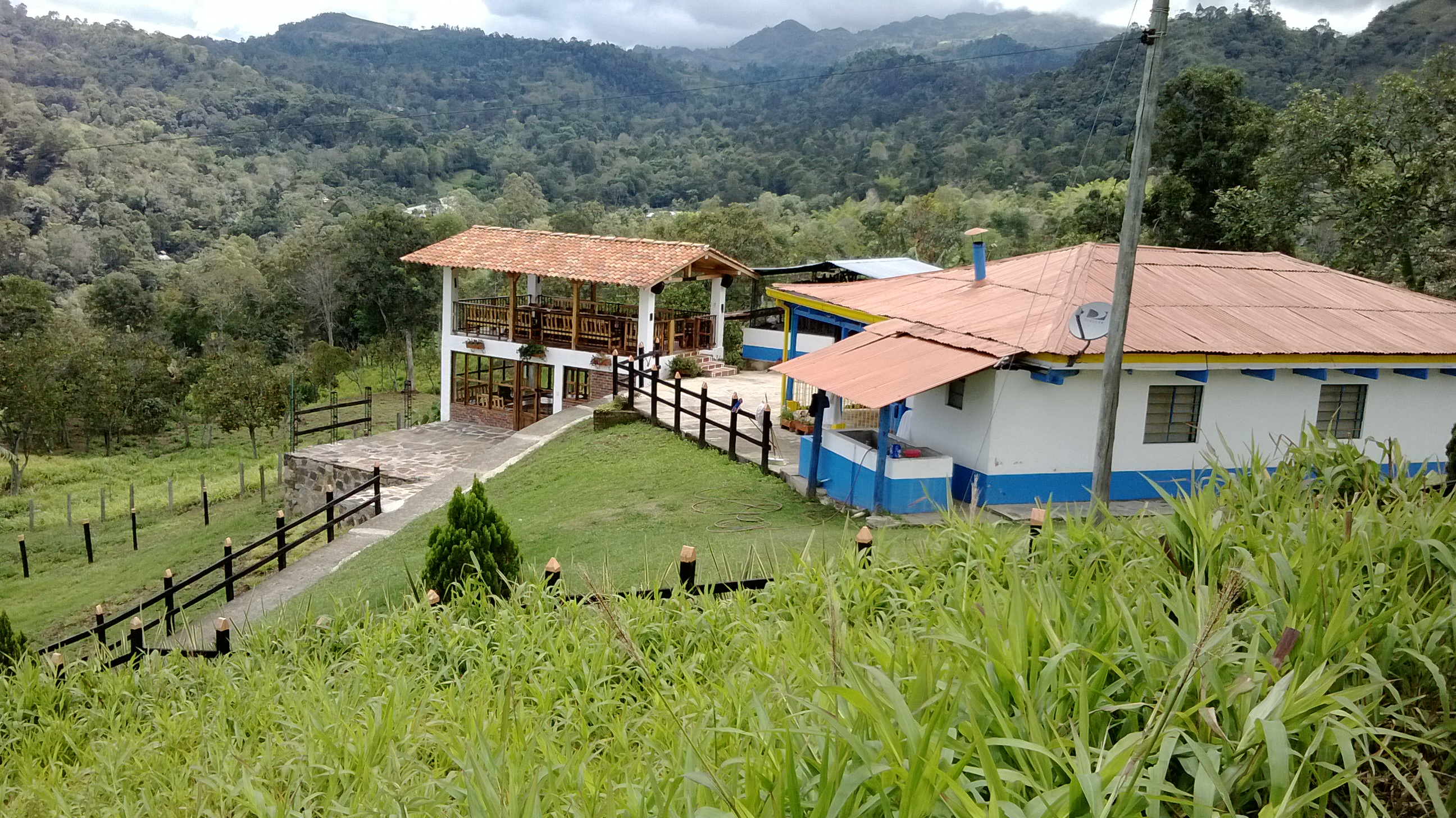
A hacienda in San Francisco de Sales
