= Rionegro Province =

Rionegro Province Provincia de Rionegro
- Province
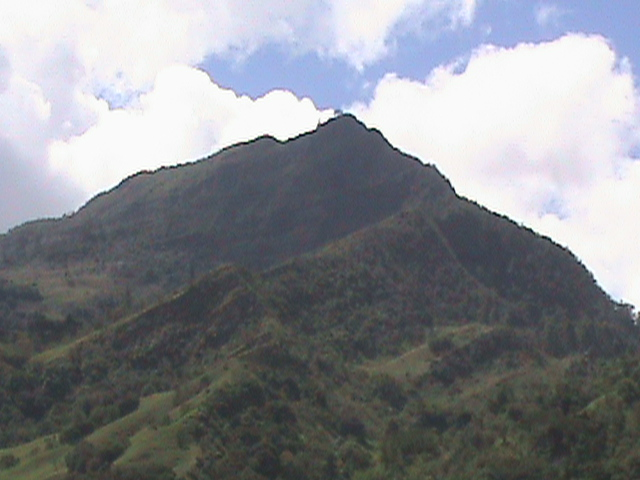
- Wayoke Hill, Pacho
- Etymology: Río Negro
- Location of Rionegro Province in Colombia
- Coordinates: 5°07′50″N 74°09′30″W
- Country: Colombia
- Department: Cundinamarca
- Capital: Pacho
- Municipalities: 8
- Time zone: UTC−05:00 (COT)
- Indigenous groups: Muzo; Panche; Muisca

Rionegro Province is one of the 15 provinces in the Cundinamarca Department, in Colombia.
