= Nocaima =

- Municipality and town
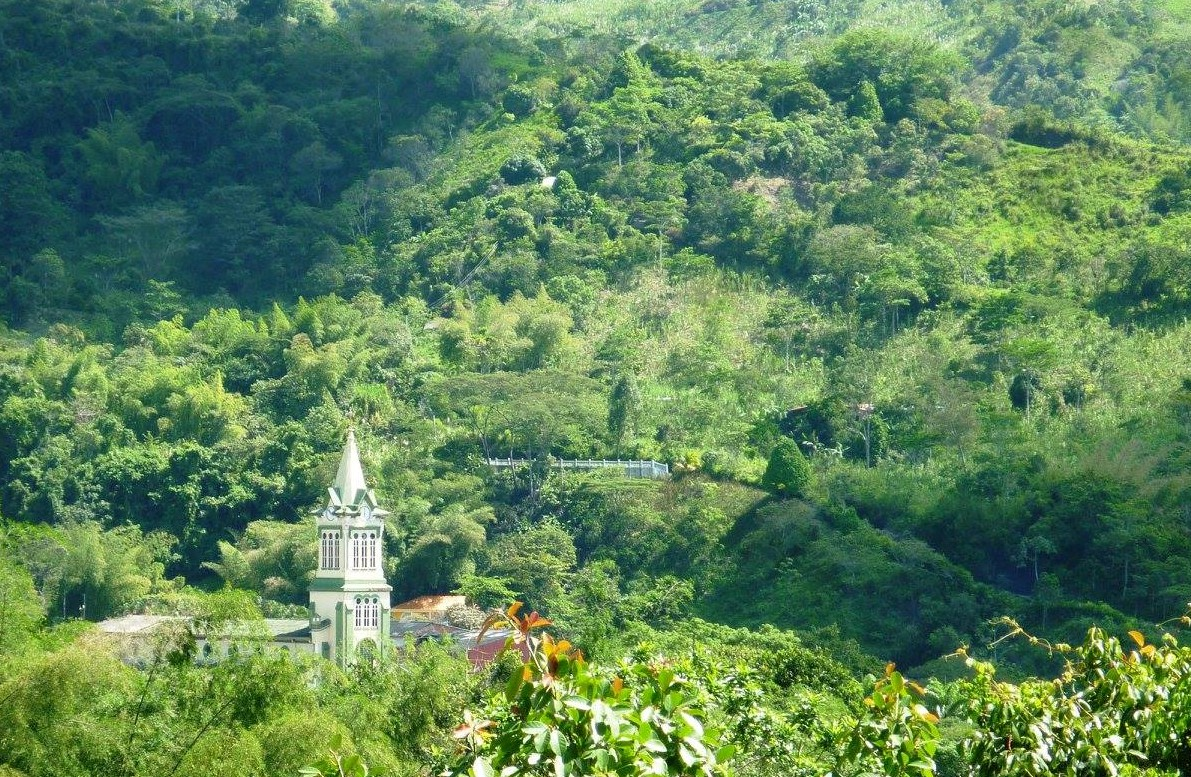

- Flag

- Location of the municipality and town of Gómez Plata in the Antioquia Department of Colombia

- Location in Colombia
- Coordinates: 5°4′13″N 74°22′41″W
- Country: Colombia
- Department: Cundinamarca
- Time zone: UTC-5 (Colombia Standard Time)

Nocaima (Spanish pronunciation: [noˈkajma]) is a municipality and town of Colombia in the department of Cundinamarca. Founded on June 8, 1605, it is one of the oldest European settlements in Colombia. It sits in the hills of the Andes, about 60 km outside Bogotá, the capital of Colombia.
