= Quebradanegra =

- Municipality and town
- Flag Coat of arms

- Location of the municipality and town of Gómez Plata in the Antioquia Department of Colombia

- Location in Colombia
- Coordinates: 5°7′4″N 74°28′45″W
- Country: Colombia
- Department: Cundinamarca

Population (2020)
  - Total: 5,000
- Time zone: UTC-5 (Colombia Standard Time)
- Website: www.quebradanegra-cundinamarca.gov.co/

Quebradanegra (Spanish pronunciation: [keβɾaðaˈneɣɾa]) is a municipality and town of Colombia in the department of Cundinamarca, located approximately 100 km northwest of Bogotá. It has a population of approximately 5,000 residents, with a majority of working age.

== Geography and location ==
Quebradanegra is located in the Cundinamarca Department, approximately 100 km northwest of the national capital Bogotá.

The municipality has suffered from landslides which can be 350 meters long. These events are a risk to the area, especially if the reach streams such as La Negra River. Due to the recurring risk, the area is under constant monitoring by the Regional Autonomous Corporation of Cundinamarca (CAR) and local emergency services.

== Demographics ==
According to data provided by the National Administrative Department of Statistics, Quebradanegra has shown steady population growth over the first two decades of the 21st century. Following the 2018 Colombian census adjustments, the population was estimated at 4,618 in 2005, rising to 4,673 in 2010 and 4,798 in 2015. The population was projected to reach 5,000 inhabitants by 2020, reflecting an annual population growth rate of 0.83% over a five-year period. The municipality's total land area is 79.86 km², resulting in a population density of approximately 62.61 inhabitants per km².

The demographic composition of Quebradanegra in 2020 shows males making up 52.3% (2,615) of the population and females the remaining 47.7% (2,385). The age distribution shows a significant working age majority, with 61.5% of residents falling within the 15 to 64 age bracket. The remaining population is divided almost equally between children aged 0 to 14 years (19%) and seniors aged 65 and over (19.6%).
