= La Peña, Cundinamarca =

La Peña
- Municipality and town
- Flag Coat of arms

- Location of the municipality and town of Gómez Plata in the Antioquia Department of Colombia

- Location in Colombia
- Coordinates: 5°11′57″N 74°23′37″W
- Country: Colombia
- Department: Cundinamarca
- Time zone: UTC-5 (Colombia Standard Time)

La Peña is a municipality and town of Colombia in the department of Cundinamarca. La Peña is located in the west of Cundinamarca, in Gualivá Province, 93 kilometres (58 mi) from Bogotá.
