= La Vega, Cundinamarca =

La Vega
- Municipality and town
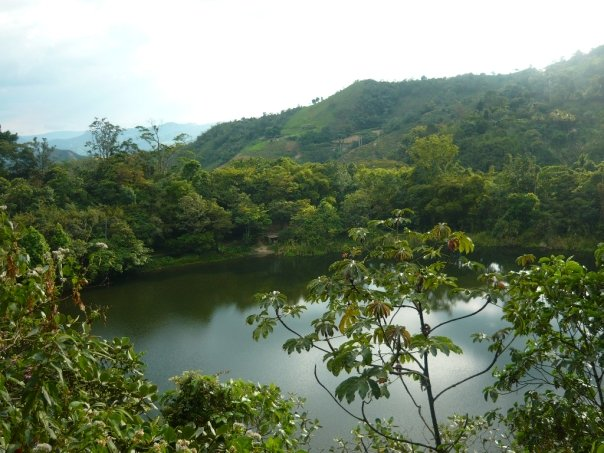

- Flag Coat of arms

- Location of the municipality and town inside Cundinamarca Department of Colombia

- Location in Colombia
- Coordinates: 4°59′57″N 74°20′28″W
- Country: Colombia
- Department: Cundinamarca
- Elevation: 1.230 m (4.04 ft)

Population (Census 2018)
  - Total: 13,085
- Time zone: UTC-5 (Colombia Standard Time)

La Vega (Spanish pronunciation: [la ˈβeɣa], officially San Juan de la Vega) is a municipality and town of Colombia in the department of Cundinamarca.
