= Topaipí =

- Municipality and town
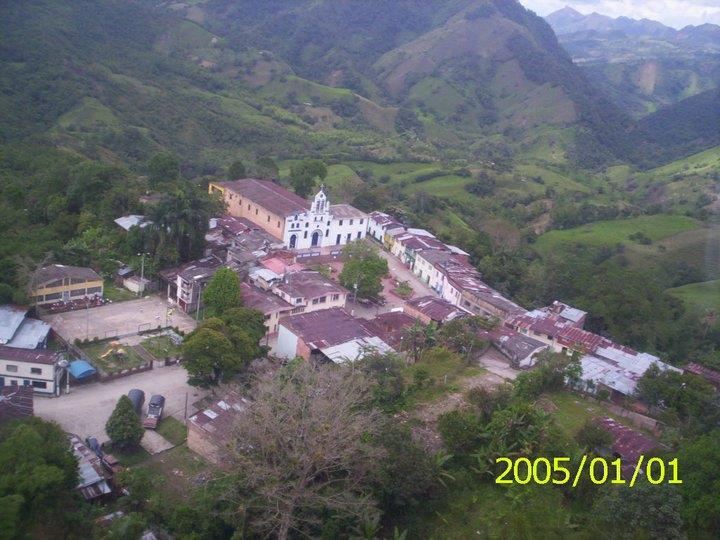

- Flag Coat of arms

- Location of the municipality and town inside Cundinamarca Department of Colombia

- Location in Colombia
- Coordinates: 5°20′N 74°18′W
- Country: Colombia
- Department: Cundinamarca

Area
  - Total: 150 km^{2} (58 sq mi)
- Elevation: 1,323 m (4,341 ft)

Population (2015)
  - Total: 4,529
  - Density: 30/km^{2} (78/sq mi)
- Time zone: UTC-5 (Colombia Standard Time)

Topaipí is a municipality and town of Colombia in the department of Cundinamarca.
