= Vergara, Cundinamarca =

Vergara
- Municipality and town
- Flag Coat of arms

- Location of the municipality and town of Gómez Plata in the Antioquia Department of Colombia

- Location in Colombia
- Coordinates: 5°10′N 74°20′W
- Country: Colombia
- Department: Cundinamarca
- Time zone: UTC-5 (Colombia Standard Time)

Vergara (Spanish pronunciation: [beɾˈɣaɾa]) is a municipality and town of Colombia in the department of Cundinamarca.
