= Quipile =

- Municipality and town
- Flag Coat of arms

- Location of the municipality and town inside Cundinamarca Department of Colombia

- Location in Colombia
- Coordinates: 4°44′36″N 74°34′0″W
- Country: Colombia
- Department: Cundinamarca
- Province: Tequendama Province
- Founded: 12 November 1825
- Founder: José María Lozano

Government
  - Mayor: Pedro Luis Aponte Castro (2016-2019)

Area
  - Municipality and town: 127.6 km^{2} (49.3 sq mi)
  - Urban: 0.35 km^{2} (0.14 sq mi)
- Elevation: 2,012 m (6,601 ft)

Population (2015)
  - Municipality and town: 8,164
  - Density: 63.98/km^{2} (165.7/sq mi)
  - Urban: 676
- Time zone: UTC-5 (Colombia Standard Time)
- Website: Official website

Quipile is a municipality and town of Colombia in the Tequendama Province of the department of Cundinamarca. The municipality borders Bituima and Vianí in the north, Jerusalén and Anapoima in the south, Anolaima, Cachipay and La Mesa in the east and San Juan de Rioseco and Pulí in the west. The urban centre is located at an altitude of 2,012 metres (6,601 ft) at a distance of 83 kilometres (52 mi) from the capital Bogotá.

== Etymology ==
The name Quipile comes from the Cariban language of the Panche and means "strong and superior place". It is derived from Quipili, the name of the cacique of the Panche.

== History ==
In the time before the Spanish conquest of the Muisca, Quipile was inhabited by the Panche. They were submitted to the Spanish rule of the New Kingdom of Granada in the Battle of Tocarema, which took place on August 20, 1538.

The date and name of the founder is unknown but traditionally set at November 12, 1825 by José María Lozano.

== Economy ==
Quipile is an agrarian community with main products coffee, sugarcane and bananas cultivated.

== Paleontology ==
In 1956, fossil remains of Megatherium and Mastodon; Pleistocene megafauna dated at 460,000 years BP, were discovered within the boundaries of Quipile.
