= Conejo Formation =

Fossiliferous geological formation in the Eastern Ranges of the Colombian Andes

- Stratigraphic range: Turonian-Santonian; ~90–83.6 Ma
- Type: Geological formation
- Unit of: Villeta Group
- Underlies: Guadalupe Group
- Overlies: La Frontera Formation
- Thickness: up to 1,022 m (3,353 ft)

Lithology
- Primary: Sandstone, shale
- Other: Limestone

Location
- Coordinates: 5°35′40.7″N 73°12′59.6″W
- Region: Altiplano Cundiboyacense; Eastern Ranges, Andes
- Country: Colombia

Type section
- Named for: El Conejo Hill
- Named by: Renzoni
- Location: Toca, Boyacá
- Year defined: 1981
- Coordinates: 5°35′40.7″N 73°12′59.6″W
- Region: Cundinamarca, Boyacá
- Country: Colombia
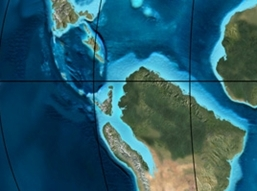
- Paleogeography of Northern South America; 90 Ma, by Ron Blakey

The Conejo Formation (Spanish: Formación Conejo, K_{2}C, Kscn) is a fossiliferous geological formation of the Altiplano Cundiboyacense, Eastern Ranges of the Colombian Andes. The uppermost unit of the Villeta Group, a sequence of shales and sandstones dates to the Late Cretaceous period; Turonian, Coniacian and Santonian epochs, and has a maximum thickness of 1,022 metres (3,353 ft).

== Etymology ==
The formation was named in 1967 and published in 1981 by Renzoni, named after El Conejo Hill in Pontezuela, Toca, Boyacá, west of the Copa Reservoir.

== Description ==
=== Lithologies ===
The Conejo Formation is characterised by a sequence of calcareous sandstones, containing ammonites, shales and the uppermost part sandstone and limestone banks. In the Conejo Formation, fossils of Protopholoe colombiana, Archaeglobigerina blowi, Dicarinella concavata, Dicarinella primitiva, Sigalitruncana sigali, Marginotruncana sp. ct. M. renzi, Marginotruncana angusticarenata, Marginotruncana sp. cf. M.sinuosa, Rosita tornicata, Heterohelix globulosa, Heterohelix reussi, Whiteinella inornata, Hedbergella sp., and the ammonites Gloriaceras correai, Protexamites cucaitaense and Codazziceras scheibei have been found.

=== Stratigraphy and depositional environment ===
The Conejo Formation is the uppermost unit of the Villeta Group. It overlies the La Frontera Formation and is overlain by the Guadalupe Group. The age has been estimated on the basis of ammonites to be ranging from Turonian to Santonian. Stratigraphically, the lower part of the formation is time equivalent with the upper part of the Chipaque, and Loma Gorda Formations.

== Outcrops ==
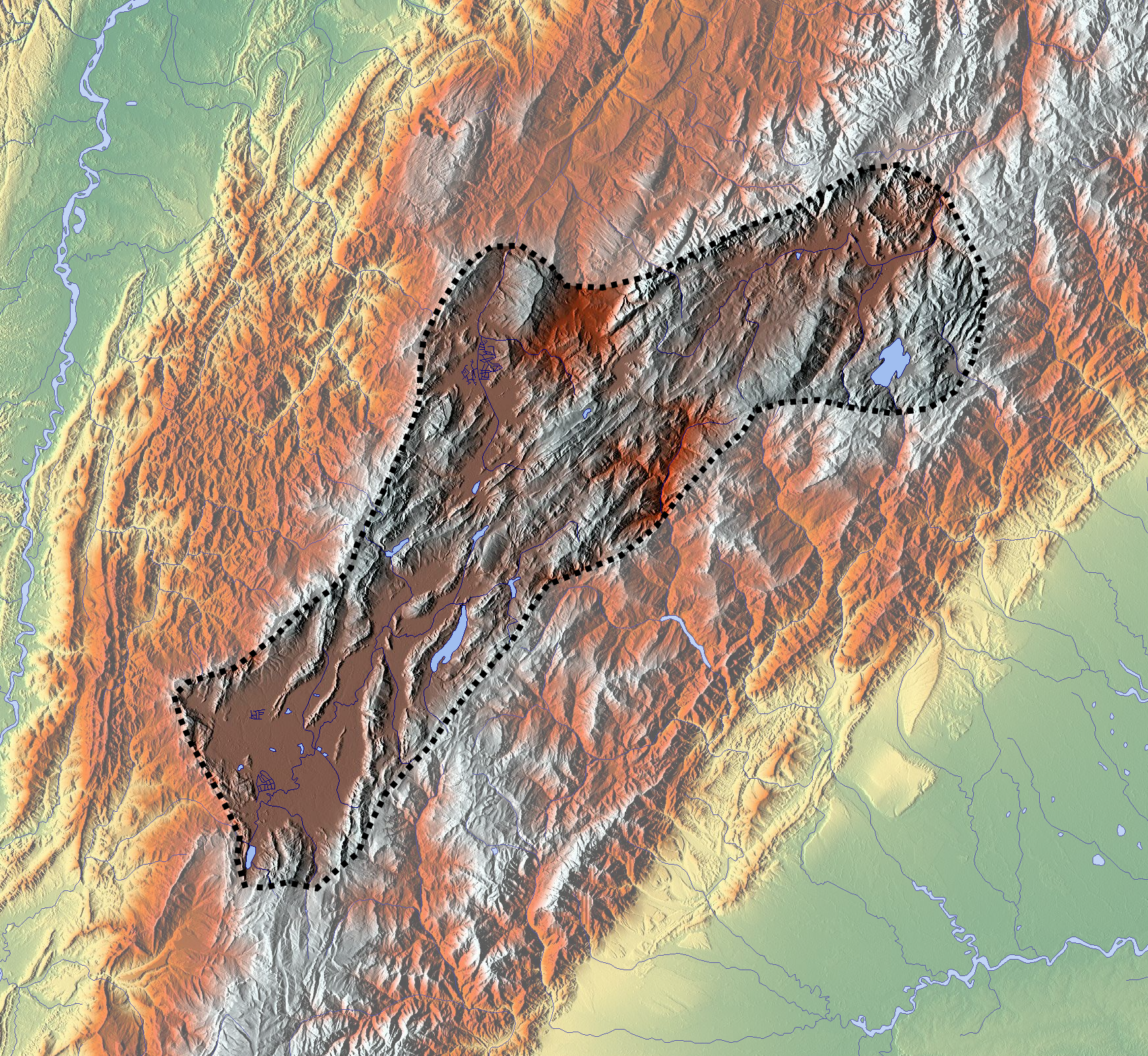
Type locality of the Conejo Formation on the Altiplano Cundiboyacense

The type locality of the Conejo Formation is located close to El Conejo Hill in Pontezuela, Toca, Boyacá. Other outcrops of the Conejo Formation have been noted in Cucaita, the urban areas of Boyacá and Ventaquemada, around the Puente de Boyacá, south of Pesca, west of Siachoque, surrounding Chiquinquirá and Ubaté, between Chivatá and Oicatá, east of Paipa, west of Tibacuy, north and south of Albán, southeast of Cachipay, east of Anolaima, and San Antonio del Tequendama, Cundinamarca.

== See also ==
Geology of the Eastern Hills
Geology of the Ocetá Páramo
Geology of the Altiplano Cundiboyacense
