= Upper Magdalena Province =

Upper Magdalena Province Provincia del Alto Magdalena
- Province
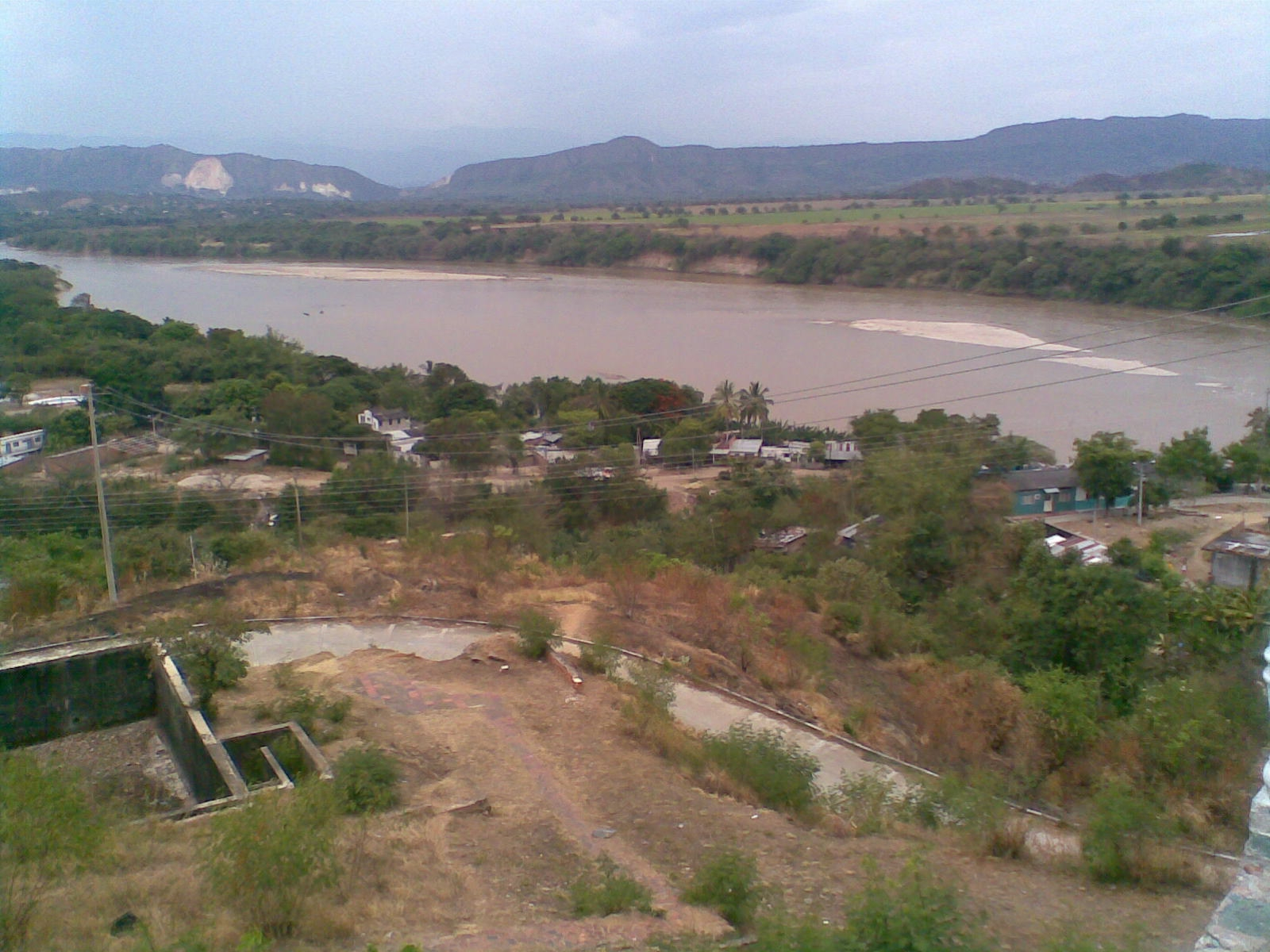
- Magdalena River in Girardot
- Etymology: Magdalena River
- Location of Upper Magdalena Province in Colombia
- Coordinates: 4°18′18″N 74°48′06″W
- Country: Colombia
- Department: Cundinamarca
- Capital: Girardot
- Municipalities: 8
- Time zone: UTC−05:00 (COT)
- Indigenous groups: Panche

Upper Magdalena Province (Spanish: Provincia del Alto Magdalena) is one of the 15 provinces in the Cundinamarca Department, Colombia. Upper Magdalena borders to the west with the Magdalena River and the Tolima Department, to the north with the Central Magdalena Province, to the east with the Tequendama Province and to the southeast with the Sumapaz Province.

Upper Magdalena contains eight municipalities:

- Agua de Dios
- Girardot
- Guataquí
- Jerusalén
- Nariño
- Nilo
- Ricaurte
- Tocaima
