= Central Magdalena Province =

Central Magdalena Province Provincia de Magdalena Centro
- Province
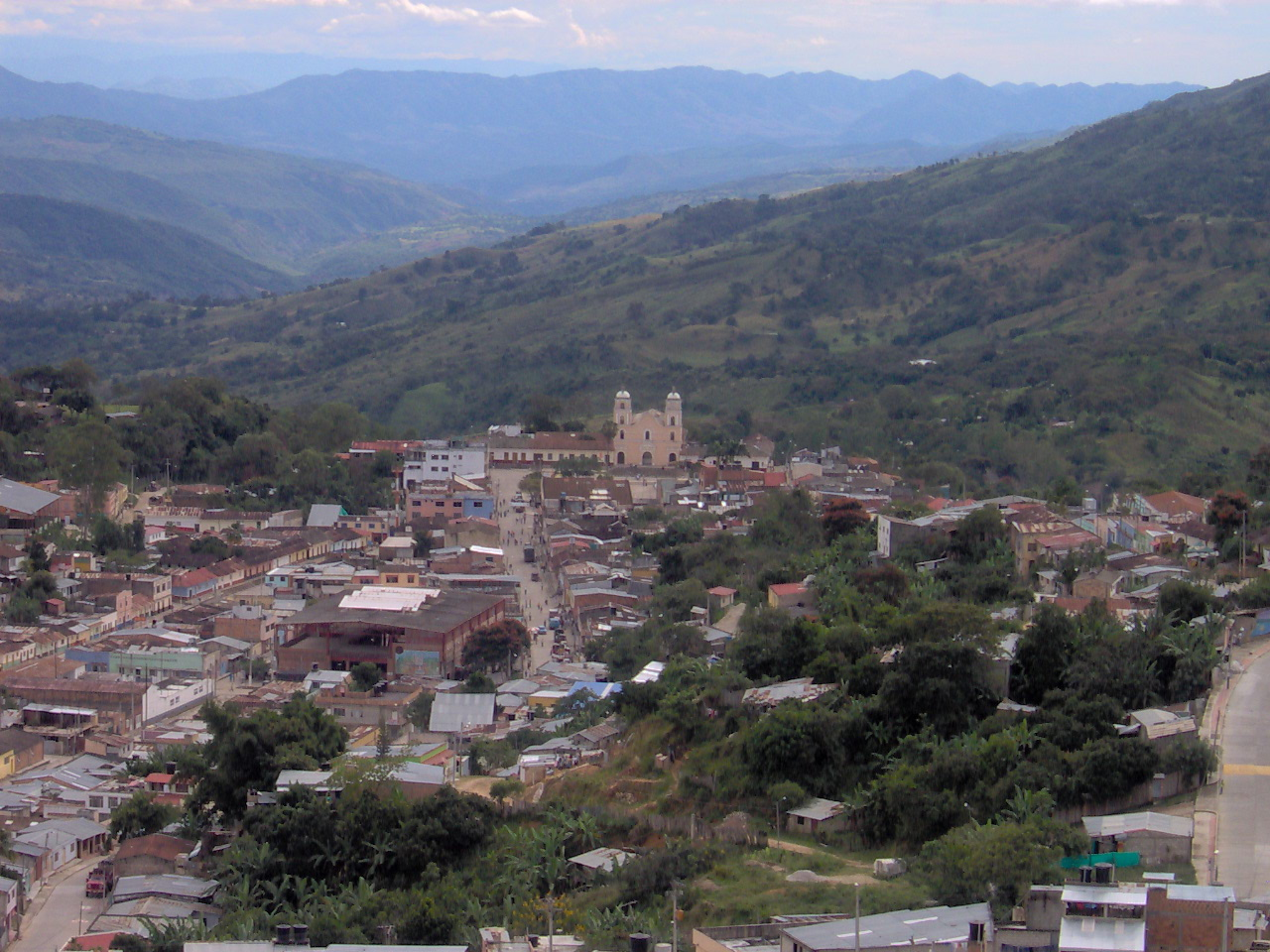
- View of San Juan de Rioseco
- Etymology: Magdalena River
- Location of Central Magdalena Province in Colombia
- Coordinates: 4°50′55″N 74°37′14″W
- Country: Colombia
- Department: Cundinamarca
- Capital: San Juan de Rioseco
- Municipalities: 7
- Time zone: UTC−05:00 (COT)
- Indigenous groups: Panche

Central Magdalena Province (Spanish: Provincia de Magdalena Centro) is one of the 15 provinces in the Cundinamarca Department, Colombia. Central Magdalena borders to the west the Tolima Department and the Magdalena River, to the north the Lower Magdalena Province, to the east the Gualivá and Tequendama Provinces and to the south the Upper Magdalena Province.

Central Magdalena Province contains seven municipalities:

- Beltrán
- Bituima
- Chaguaní
- Guayabal de Síquima
- Pulí
- San Juan de Rioseco
- Vianí
