= Jerusalén =

Jerusalén, Spanish for Jerusalem, may refer to:

- Jerusalén, Cundinamarca, Colombia
- Jerusalén, El Salvador
