= Tequendama Province =

Tequendama Province Provincia de Tequendama
- Province
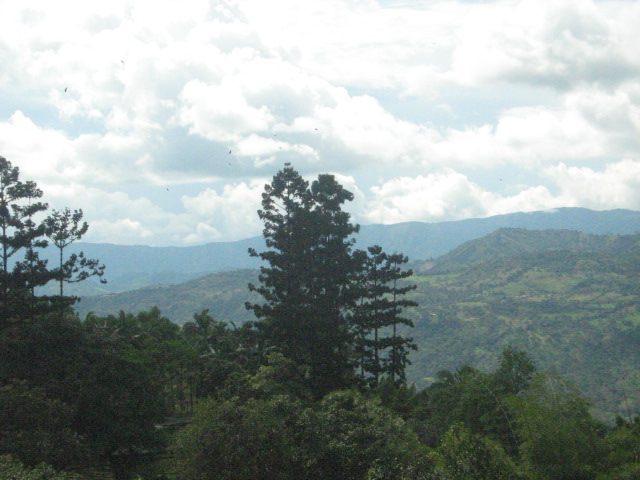
- View of La Mesa
- Etymology: Tequendama
- Location of Tequendama Province in Colombia
- Coordinates: 4°37′58″N 74°21′08″W
- Country: Colombia
- Department: Cundinamarca
- Capital: San Antonio del Tequendama
- Municipalities: 10
- Time zone: UTC−05:00 (COT)
- Indigenous groups: Panche; Muisca

Tequendama Province is one of the 15 provinces in the Cundinamarca Department, Colombia.

== Etymology ==
The name Tequendama means in the Chibcha language of the Muisca; "he who precipitates downward".

== Subdivision ==
Tequendama Province comprises ten municipalities:

- San Antonio del Tequendama
- Anapoima
- Anolaima
- Apulo
- Cachipay
- El Colegio
- La Mesa
- Quipile
- Tena
- Viotá

== Panorama ==
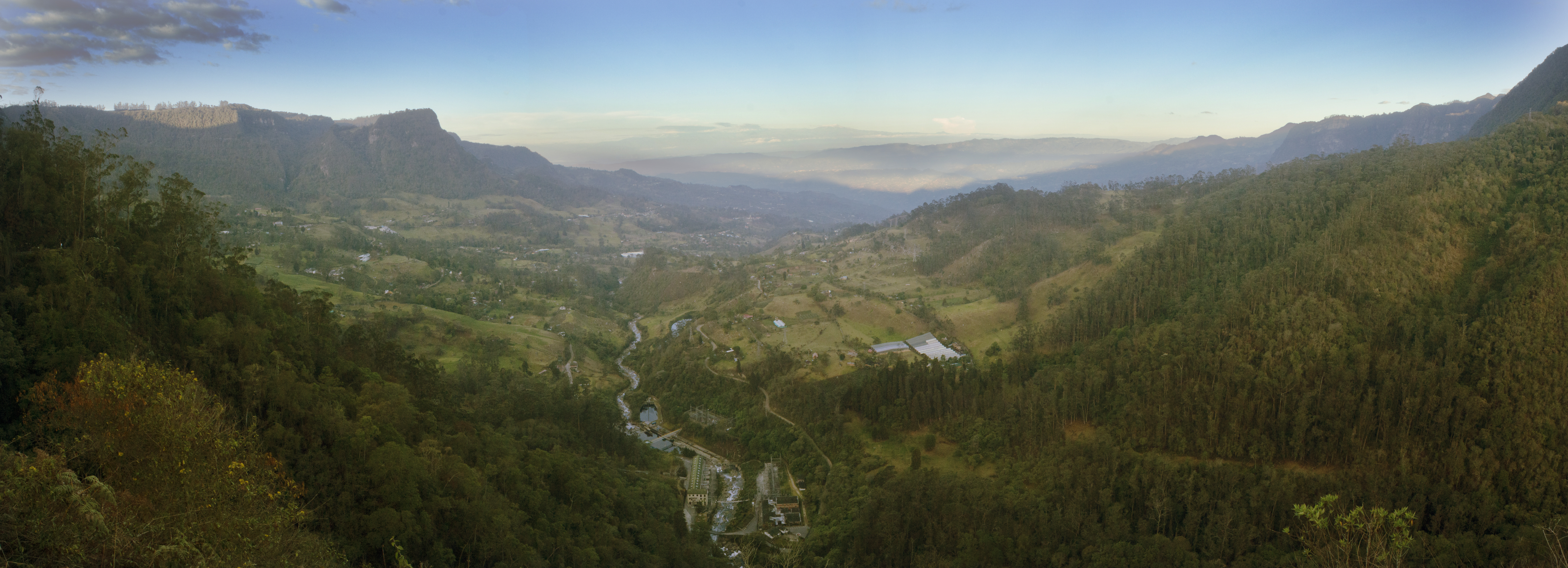
Panorama of the Tena Valley, Tequendama Province
