= Tena, Cundinamarca =

Tena
- Municipality and town
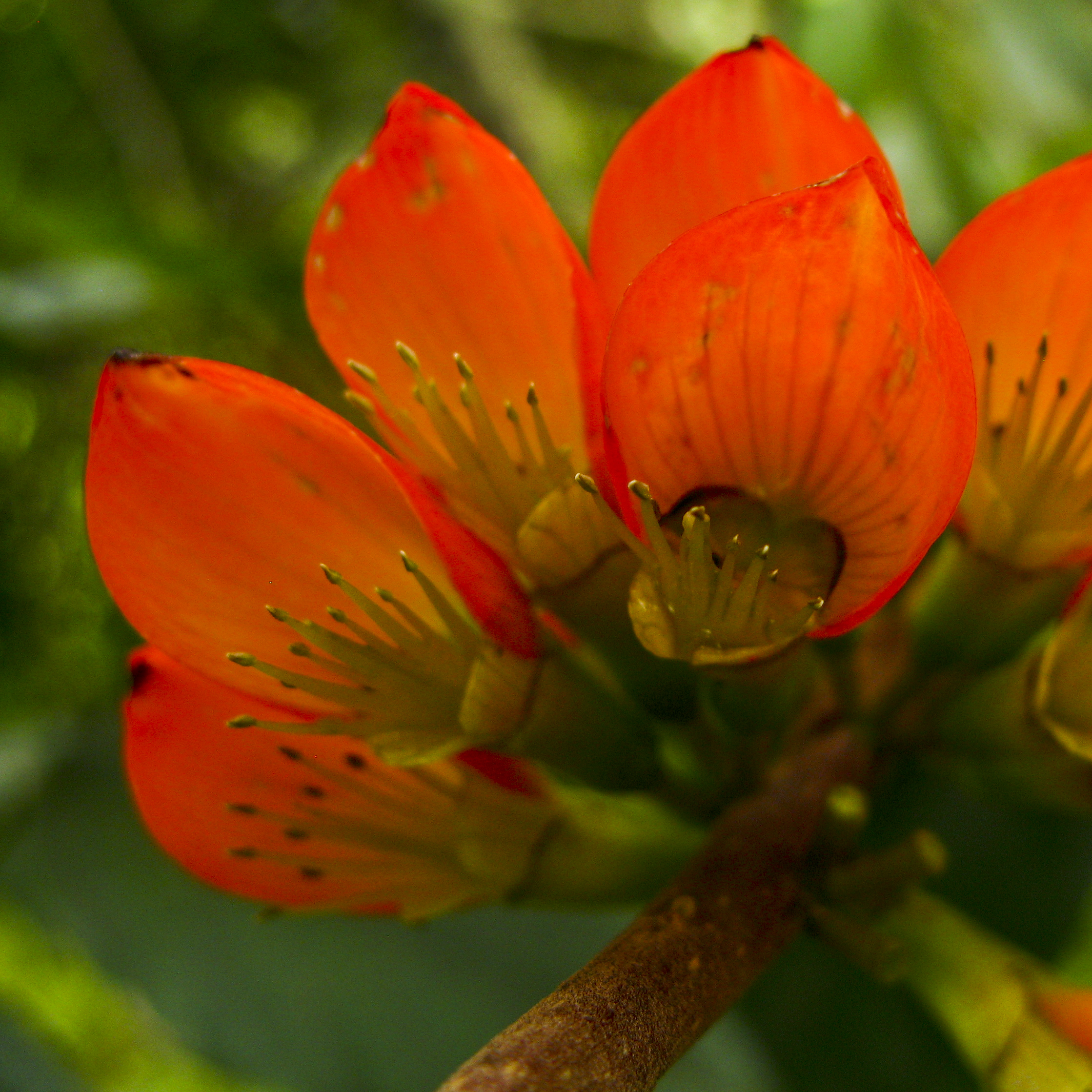
- Flower in Tena

- Flag Coat of arms

- Location of the municipality and town inside Cundinamarca Department of Colombia

- Location in Colombia
- Coordinates: 4°39′17″N 74°23′24″W
- Country: Colombia
- Department: Cundinamarca
- Province: Tequendama Province
- Founded: 11 December 1607
- Founder: Borja

Government
  - Mayor: Luis Carlos Vargas Lozano (2020-2023)

Area
  - Municipality and town: 55 km^{2} (21 sq mi)
  - Urban: 25 km^{2} (9.7 sq mi)
- Elevation: 1,384 m (4,541 ft)

Population (2015)
  - Municipality and town: 8,941
  - Density: 160/km^{2} (420/sq mi)
  - Urban: 849
- Time zone: UTC-5 (Colombia Standard Time)
- Website: Official website

Tena is a municipality and town of Colombia in the Tequendama Province, part of the department of Cundinamarca. The urban centre is located at an altitude of 1,384 metres (4,541 ft) at a distance of 42 kilometres (26 mi) from the capital Bogotá. The municipality borders Bojaca in the north, La Mesa in the west, San Antonio del Tequendama in the east and El Colegio in the south. The southern border of Tena is formed by the Bogotá River.

== Etymology ==
In the Chibcha language, Tena means "Place of rest for the zipa".

== History ==
In the times before the Spanish conquest, Tena was inhabited by the Muisca. The area of Tena formed the western border region with the territories of the Panche.

Modern Tena was founded on December 11, 1607 by Borja.

== Economy ==
Main economical activities in Tena are agriculture, livestock farming and fishing.
