= San Antonio del Tequendama =

- Municipality and town
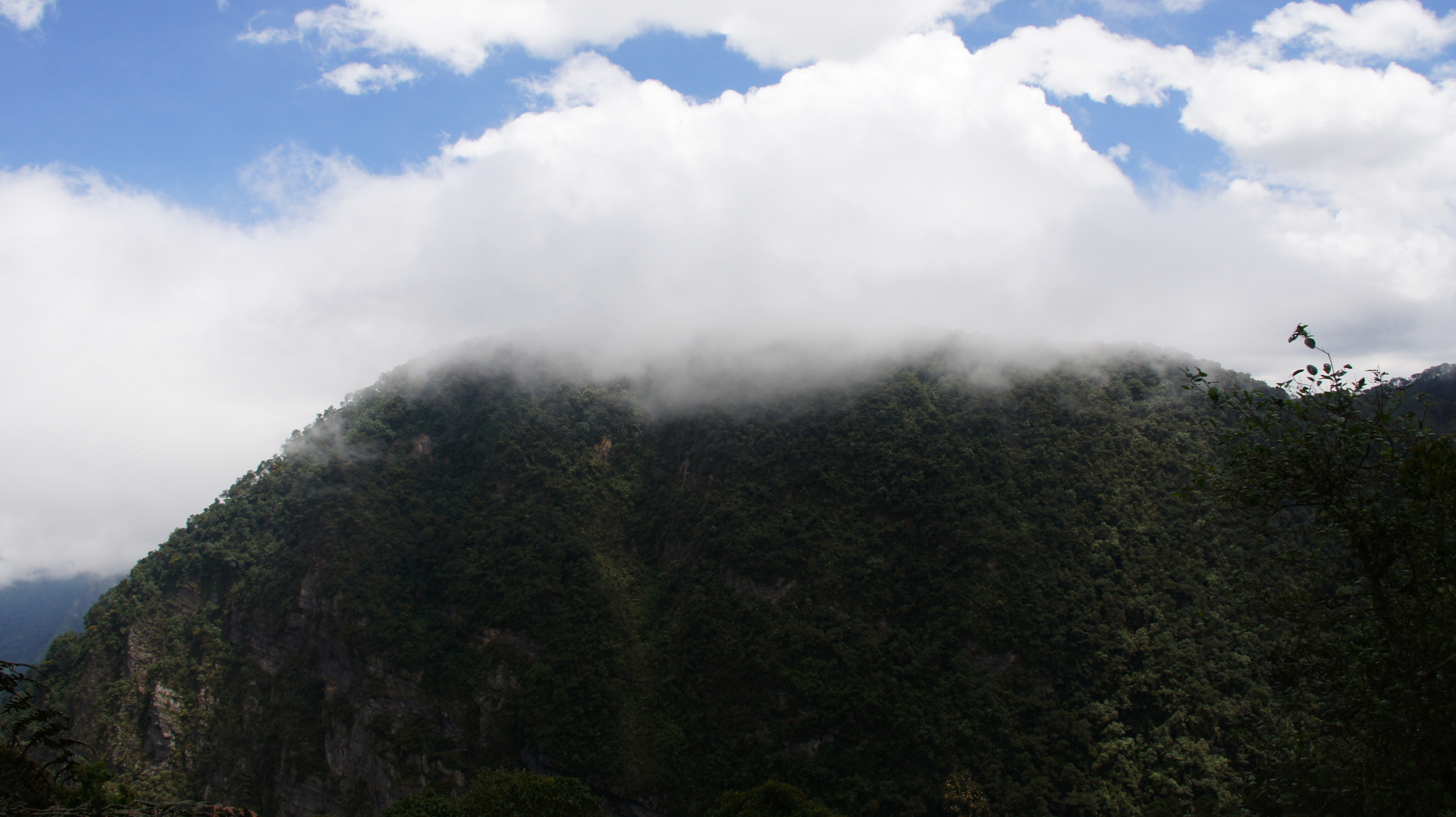
- Chicaque Natural Park

- Flag Coat of arms

- Location of the municipality and town inside Cundinamarca department of Colombia

- Location in Colombia
- Coordinates: 4°37′58″N 74°21′8″W
- Country: Colombia
- Department: Cundinamarca
- Province: Tequendama Province
- Founded: 10 February 1857
- Founder: Críspulo Corredor

Government
  - Mayor: Luis Maria Gordillo Sánchez (2016–2019)

Area
  - Municipality and town: 82 km^{2} (32 sq mi)
  - Urban: 22 km^{2} (8.5 sq mi)
- Elevation: 1,540 m (5,050 ft)

Population (2015)
  - Municipality and town: 13,084
  - Density: 160/km^{2} (410/sq mi)
  - Urban: 1,018
- Time zone: UTC-5 (Colombia Standard Time)
- Website: Official website

San Antonio del Tequendama is a municipality and town of Colombia in the Tequendama Province part of the department of Cundinamarca. The municipality is located along the Serranía de Subía in the Tena Valley and borders Tena and Bojacá in the north, Bojacá and Soacha in the east, La Mesa and El Colegio in the west and in the south Soacha and Granada.

== Etymology ==
The name Tequendama means in the Muysccubun, the language of the Muisca: "he who precipitated downward".

== History ==
This municipality was formed on the site of Cubsió, a place of reunion of the Muisca originally from Bojacá and Serrezuela. Cubsió was already populated by indigenous peoples from the Herrera Period with the oldest evidence dated at 1865 years BP (2nd century AD) of a site a few meters from the current course of the Bogotá River.

Around 1470 the terrains of San Antonio de Tequendama were ruled by the cacique of Fusagasugá, who fought with the Panche against Saguamanchica in the Battle of Pasca.

In 1539, conquistador Gonzalo Jiménez de Quesada organised an expedition down the Bogotá River where he sent his soldier Juan de Céspedes.

The modern town was founded by Críspulo Corredor in 1857. This municipality has changed names multiples times, San Antonio, San Antonio de Tena, and its actual name San Antonio del Tequendama.

== Tourism ==
The Chicaque Natural Park is an ecotouristic area within San Antonio del Tequendama.

== Panorama ==
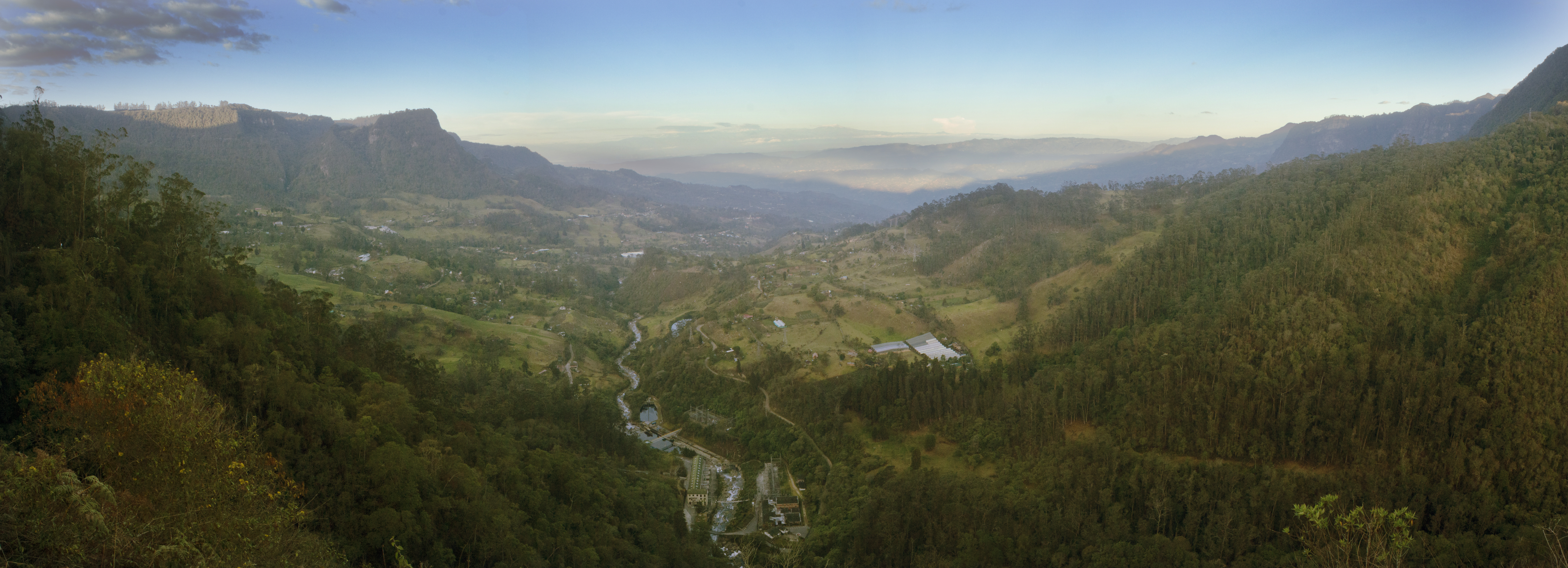
Panorama of the Tena Valley and San Antonio del Tequendama
