= Lower Magdalena Province =

Lower Magdalena Province Provincia del Bajo Magdalena
- Province
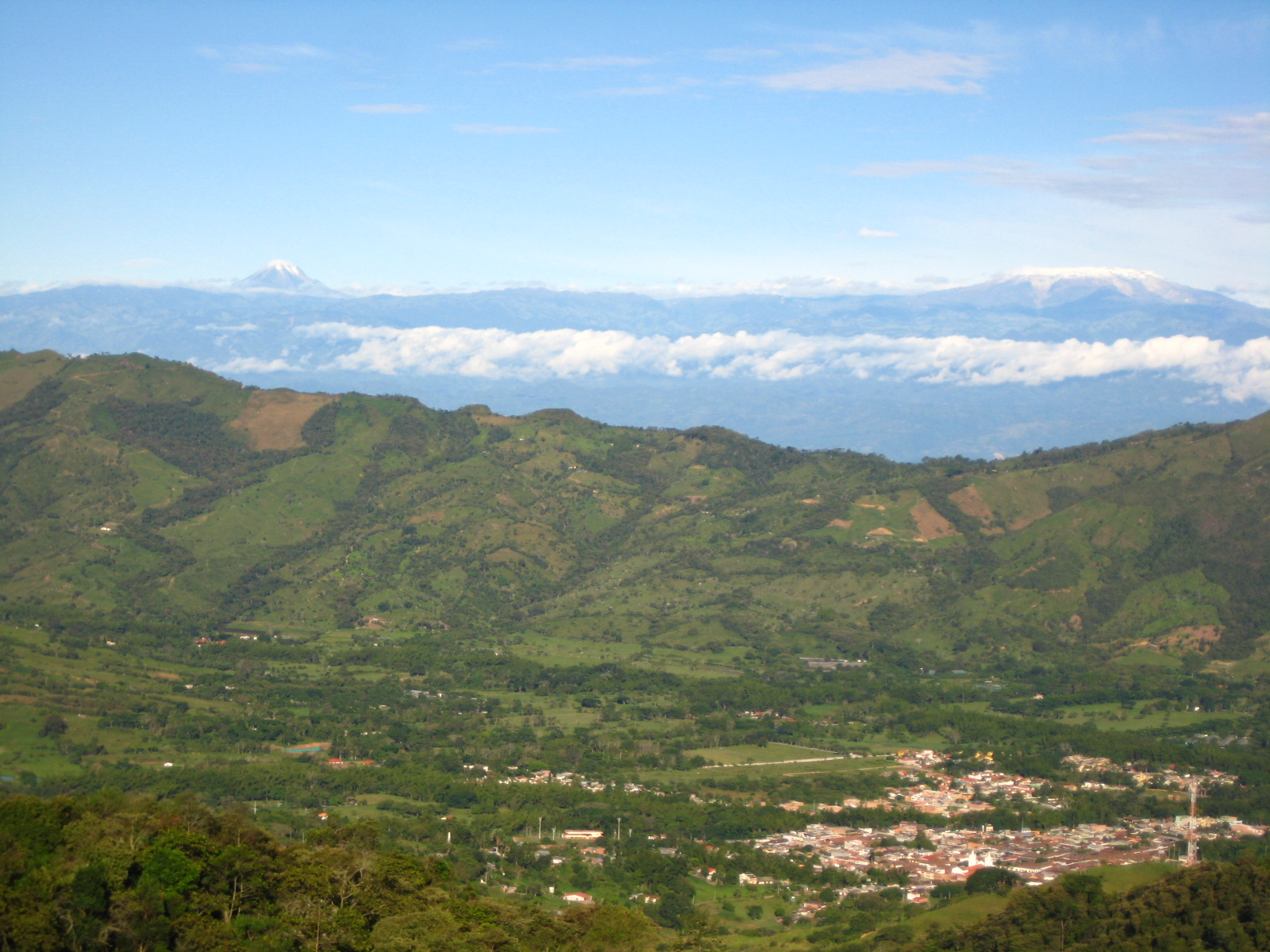
- Nevado del Ruiz seen from Guaduas
- Etymology: Magdalena River
- Location of Lower Magdalena Province in Colombia
- Coordinates: 5°04′10″N 74°35′53″W
- Country: Colombia
- Department: Cundinamarca
- Capital: Guaduas
- Municipalities: 3
- Time zone: UTC−05:00 (COT)
- Indigenous groups: Muzo; Panche

Lower Magdalena Province (Spanish: Provincia del Bajo Magdalena) is one of the 15 provinces in the Cundinamarca Department, Colombia. Lower Magdalena borders to the west with the Magdalena River, the Departments of Tolima and Caldas, to the north with the Boyacá Department, to the east with the Rionegro Province and Gualiva Province, and to the south with the Central Magdalena Province.

The Lower Magdalena Province contains three municipalities:

- Caparrapí
- Guaduas
- Puerto Salgar
