= Cachipay, Cundinamarca =

Cachipay
- Municipality and town
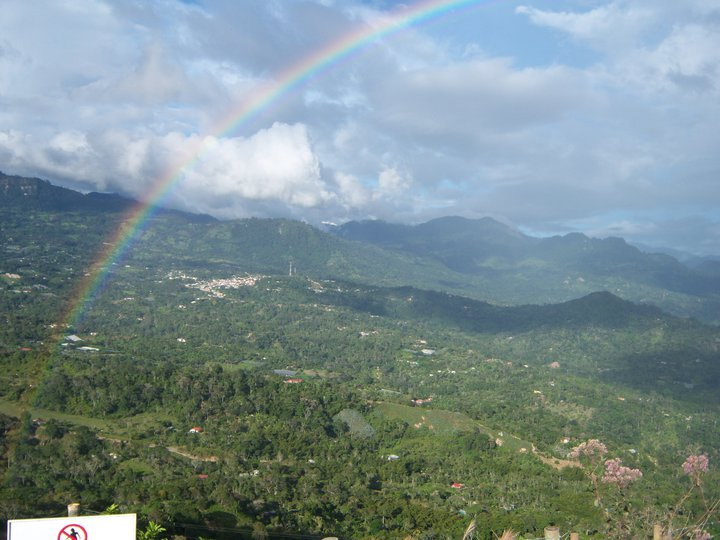
- Rainbow at the view of Cachipay

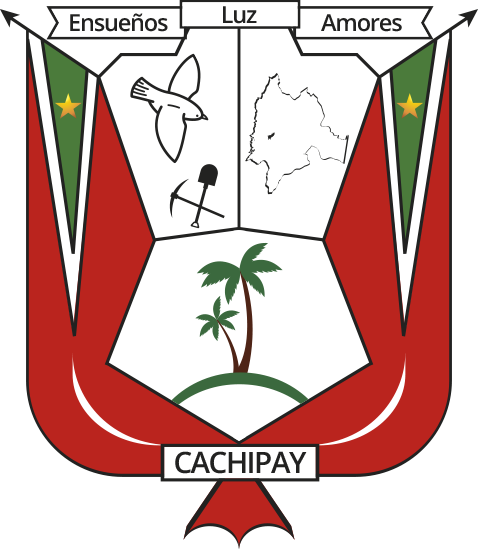
- Flag Coat of arms

- Location of the municipality and town inside Cundinamarca Department of Colombia

- Location in Colombia
- Coordinates: 4°43′51″N 74°26′15″W
- Country: Colombia
- Department: Cundinamarca
- Province: Tequendama Province
- Founded: 26 November 1982

Government
  - Mayor: Efraín Moncada Sánchez (2020-2023)

Area
  - Municipality and town: 56 km^{2} (22 sq mi)
- Elevation: 1,600 m (5,200 ft)

Population (2015)
  - Municipality and town: 9,833
  - Density: 180/km^{2} (450/sq mi)
  - Urban: 3,153
- Time zone: UTC-5 (Colombia Standard Time)
- Website: Official website

Cachipay is a municipality and town of Colombia in the Tequendama Province, part of the department of Cundinamarca. Cachipay borders Quipile in the west, Zipacón in the east, Anolaima in the north and La Mesa in the south. The urban centre is located 53 kilometres (33 mi) east of Bogotá.

== Etymology ==
The name Cachipay is probably derived from the Chibcha name for a fruit similar to the typical Colombian fruit corozo.

== History ==
The history of the present municipality of Cachipay dates back at least to the Herrera Period, from which ceramics have been found in the current vereda Tocarema, dated at 2750 years BP (750 BCE). The region before the Spanish conquest of the Muisca was inhabited by the Panche people, who were in constant conflict with the Muisca inhabiting the Altiplano Cundiboyacense to the east.

Tocarema was the site of the Battle of Tocarema on August 20, 1538, where an alliance of Muisca guecha warriors and troops of the Spanish conquistador Gonzalo Jiménez de Quesada confronted and submitted the Panche, due to their superior weaponry, cavalry and the dogs trained for war.

Modern Cachipay was not founded until November 26, 1982.

== Gallery ==
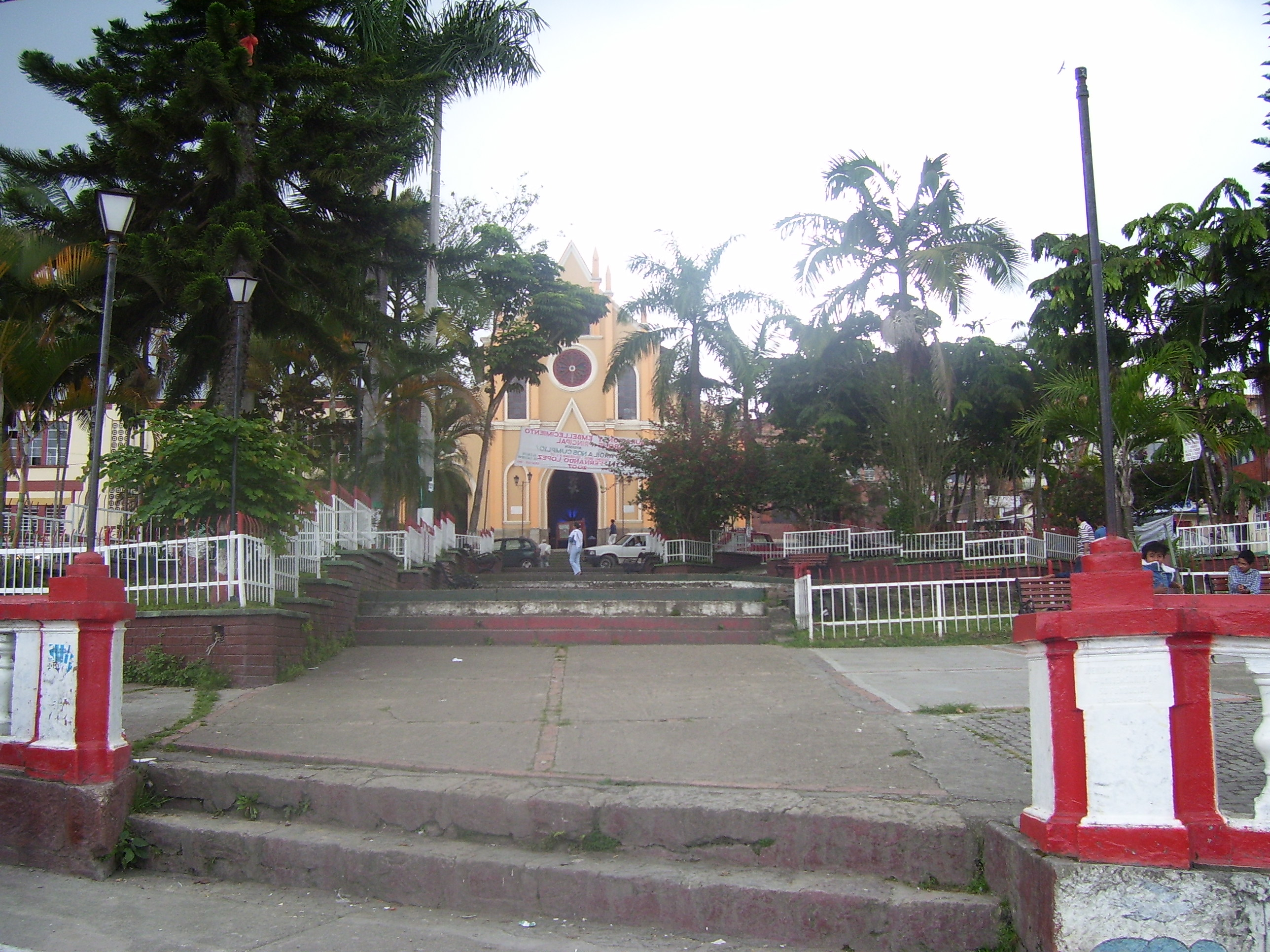
Central square of Cachipay

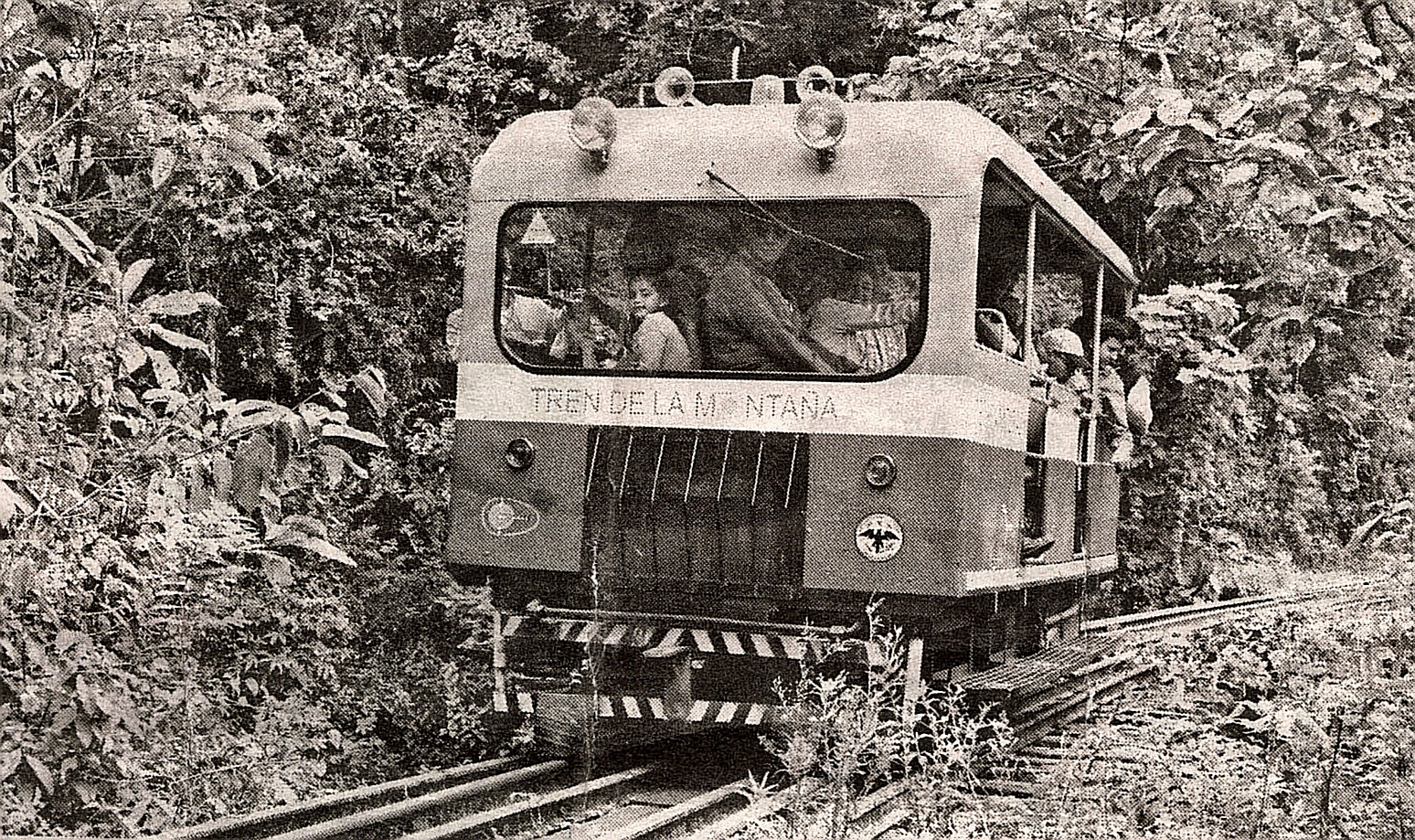
Former train in Cachipay

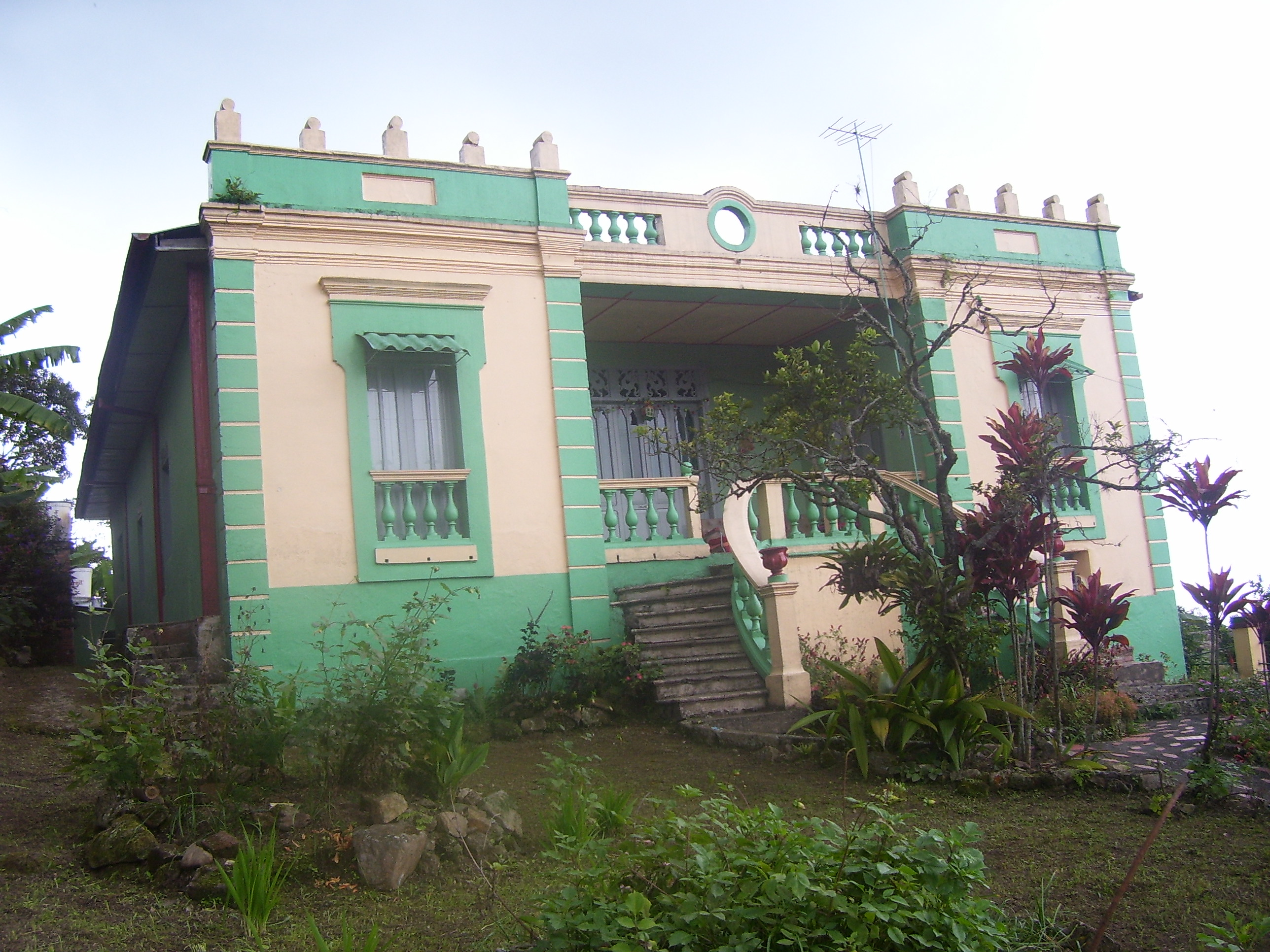
Colonial house

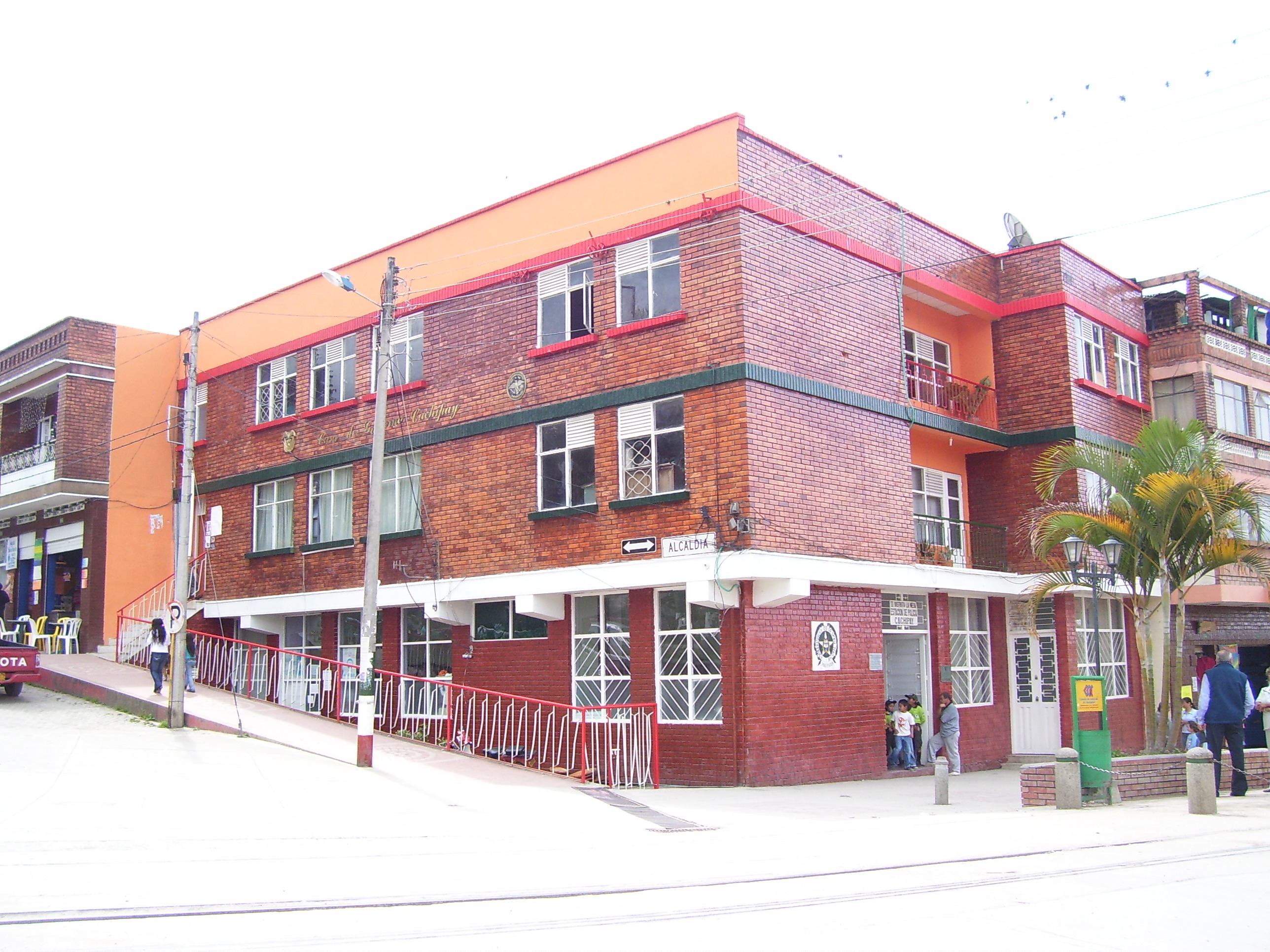
Council house

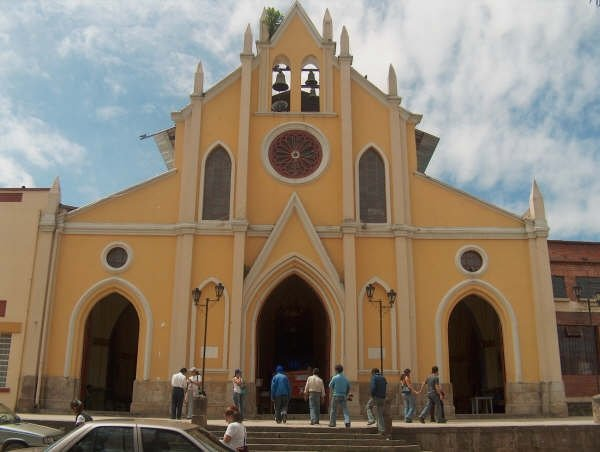
Church of Cachipay
