= Anapoima =

- Flag Coat of arms

- Localization in Cundinamarca, in Colombia
- Coordinates: 4°33′01″N 74°32′10″W
- Country: Colombia
- Departamento: Cundinamarca

Government
  - Mayor: Hugo Alexander Bermúdez Riveros (2020 - 2023)

Area
  - Total: 124.2 km^{2} (48.0 sq mi)
- Elevation: 710 m (2,330 ft)

Population (Census 2018)
  - Total: 12,241
  - Density: 98.56/km^{2} (255.3/sq mi)
- Time zone: UTC-5 (COT)
  - Summer (DST): UTC-5 (COT)
- Website: http://www.anapoima-cundinamarca.gov.co

Anapoima (Spanish pronunciation: [anaˈpojma]) is a Colombian municipality in the department of Cundinamarca located 87 km (54 mi) from Bogotá.

== History ==
The first inhabitants of the region were the Anapoymas Indians of the Panche nation. Between Tocaima and Tena there existed only small indigenous houses. The town was founded on August 10, 1627, by the Spanish counsellor Don Lesmes de Espinosa Saravia. With the passing of time, following Spanish colonisation, it became the resting place for travellers whose destination was the south of Colombia.

== Geography ==
The town is located in the south west of the Cundinamarca Department, in the warm zone of the Tequendama province.

=== Town limits ===
To the north is located the town of La Mesa, to the south the towns of Apulo and Viota, to the east the town El Colegio, and to the west the towns of Jerusalén and Quipile.

=== Climate ===
The average annual temperature is 26 °C (79 °F).

Climate data for Anopoima (Mercedes Las), elevation 810 m (2,660 ft), (1981–2010)
Month	Jan	Feb	Mar	Apr	May	Jun	Jul	Aug	Sep	Oct	Nov	Dec	Year
Mean daily maximum °C (°F)	30.7 (87.3)	30.8 (87.4)	30.5 (86.9)	29.8 (85.6)	29.6 (85.3)	29.9 (85.8)	30.5 (86.9)	31.3 (88.3)	31.3 (88.3)	29.9 (85.8)	29.4 (84.9)	29.6 (85.3)	30.3 (86.5)
Daily mean °C (°F)	25.3 (77.5)	25.4 (77.7)	25.2 (77.4)	24.7 (76.5)	24.7 (76.5)	24.8 (76.6)	25.1 (77.2)	25.8 (78.4)	25.6 (78.1)	24.9 (76.8)	24.5 (76.1)	24.7 (76.5)	25.1 (77.2)
Mean daily minimum °C (°F)	18.9 (66.0)	19.6 (67.3)	19.5 (67.1)	19.6 (67.3)	19.7 (67.5)	19.5 (67.1)	19.0 (66.2)	19.0 (66.2)	18.9 (66.0)	18.7 (65.7)	18.7 (65.7)	18.7 (65.7)	19.2 (66.6)
Average precipitation mm (inches)	70.4 (2.77)	97.8 (3.85)	128.1 (5.04)	127.9 (5.04)	138.6 (5.46)	45.7 (1.80)	36.9 (1.45)	46.2 (1.82)	96.5 (3.80)	141.6 (5.57)	147.8 (5.82)	90.8 (3.57)	1,168.3 (46.00)
Average precipitation days	9	11	14	17	17	12	12	10	12	17	15	12	154
Average relative humidity (%)	77	78	79	80	81	78	75	72	73	78	82	80	78
Mean monthly sunshine hours	182.9	146.8	133.3	126.0	133.3	138.0	158.1	155.0	141.0	145.7	147.0	167.4	1,774.5
Mean daily sunshine hours	5.9	5.2	4.3	4.2	4.3	4.6	5.1	5.0	4.7	4.7	4.9	5.4	4.9
Source: Instituto de Hidrologia Meteorologia y Estudios Ambientales

== Hymn ==
Fuiste cuna de Poimas y Anapoimas
Acoges a la inmensa humanidad
Te conviertes en toda una heredad
De quien viene a tus puertas a llamar

De la tribu Panche eres su hija
De los bravos Tolimas eres nieta
De la raza caribe heredera
Y de honrosa estirpe ancestral

Manantial de vida amor y paz
Salud de quien quiera en ti vivir
Amanecer de luz y de solaz
Aseguras eterno porvenir

Cuanto quieres a tus hijos
Y a quien te viene a buscar
Que amorosa le ofreces cobijo
Y hasta el alma le llegas a sanar (bis)

ANAPOIMA, ANAPOIMA
Sol de la eterna juventud

Author: Andrés Iriarte
