= Agua de Dios =

- Town
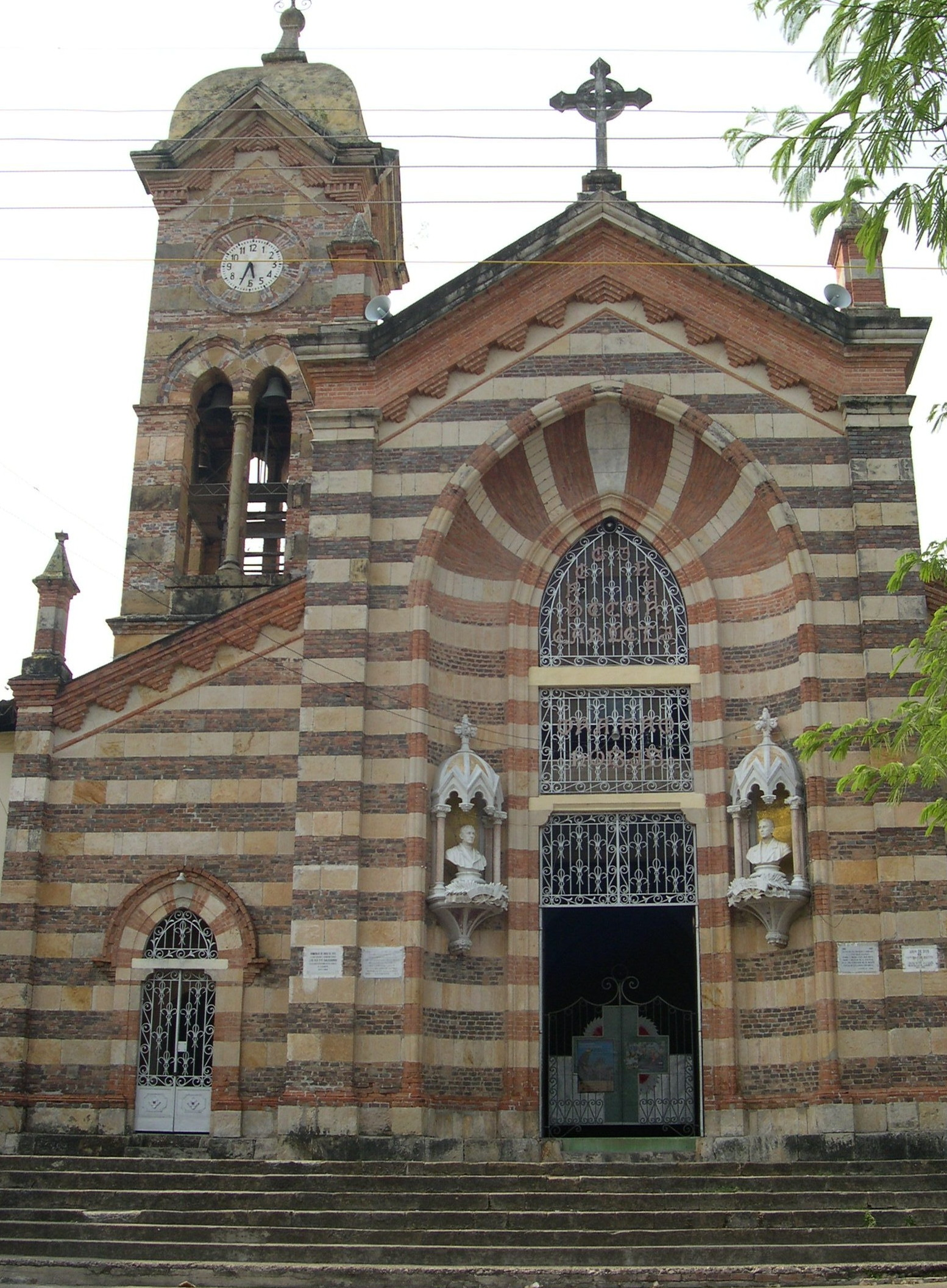

- Flag Coat of arms
- Nicknames: City of hope, Cultural capital of Cundinamarca, Hidden paradise in Cundinamarca
- Location of the town of Agua de Dios in the Cundinamarca Department.

- Location in Colombia
- Coordinates: 4°22′41″N 74°40′26″W
- Country: Colombia
- Department: Cundinamarca
- Province: Upper Magdalena Province
- Foundation: August 10, 1870

Government
  - Mayor: José Adalberto Marín Vasco

Area
  - Total: 82 km^{2} (32 sq mi)
- Elevation: 400 m (1,300 ft)

Population (Census 2018)
  - Total: 10,742
  - Density: 130/km^{2} (340/sq mi)
- Time zone: UTC-05 (Eastern Time Zone)
- Website: http://aguadedios-cundinamarca.gov.co/

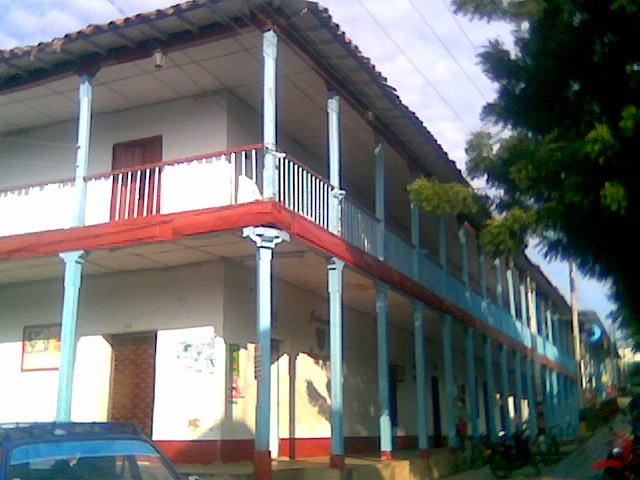
Cityhall of the town of Agua de Dios

Agua de Dios (Spanish pronunciation: [ˈaɣwa ðe ðjos], literally in English: Water of God) is a municipality and town of Colombia in the department of Cundinamarca.
