= Nelly Garzón Alarcón =

Colombian nurse and teacher (1932–2019)

Nelly Garzón Alarcón (March 8, 1932 – April 17, 2019) was a Colombian nurse and teacher, recognized as the first Latin American nurse to be president of the International Council of Nurses (ICN). In her day, she was one of the Colombian women who had the greatest relevance in science at the international level.

== Early life and education ==
Garzón was born on March 8, 1932, in the municipality of La Mesa, Cundinamarca.

She enrolled at the National University of Colombia, where she received a general nursing degree in 1958. She carried out master's studies in nursing at the Catholic University of America in Washington, D.C., United States.

== Career ==
She was elected and assumed the presidency of the ICN during the 18th Congress in 1985 in Tel Aviv, Israel. She was the first South American president of the ICN. In 1988, she received the Health for All Medal from the World Health Organization (WHO), for her leadership in the ICN and for ICN's contribution to the global movement to achieve the WHO goals for the year 2000 through primary health care (PHC); it was the first time that the WHO awarded a medal of this type to a nurse. She likewise was the first woman president of the Tribunal Nacional Ético de Enfermería (National Ethical Court of Nursing) from 1997 to 2006. In her later years, she was a professor of nursing in postgraduate programs at the National University of Colombia, until 2006. Likewise, the same university conferred on her the Doctorate Honoris Causa in 2011. She directed the legal regulation of nurses in Colombia, including the establishment of "Law 266 of 1996" and the Nursing Ethics Law, "Law 911, 2006".

She was one of the managers and the founder of the Upsilon Nu Chapter, Sigma Theta Tau International, Nursing Honor Society (STTI) at the National University of Colombia in 2007. From 2011 to 2013, she was STTI Regional Coordinator for Latin America and the Caribbean. In 2015, the Sigma Global Nursing Excellence organization awarded her the Nell J. Watts Life Time Achievement Nursing Award.

== Death ==
Garzón Alarcón died in Bogotá, on April 17, 2019, at the age of 87.

== Awards and honours ==
- Member of the American Nursing Honor Society, Society Sigma Theta Tau, Kappa Chapter.
- Nurse of the year, National Association of Nurses of Colombia. ANEC – 1970
- University Merit Medal, National University of Colombia – 1986
- Jorge Bejarano Decoration, Ministry of Health – August 1985
- Health for All Medal, World Health Organization – March 1988
- Fellow, Nightingale Society – 1988
- Academic Excellence Award, Health Area of Adexun Alumni Association, National University of Colombia – 1990
