= Guaduas =

Villa de Guaduas Villa de San Miguel de las Guaduas
- Municipality and town
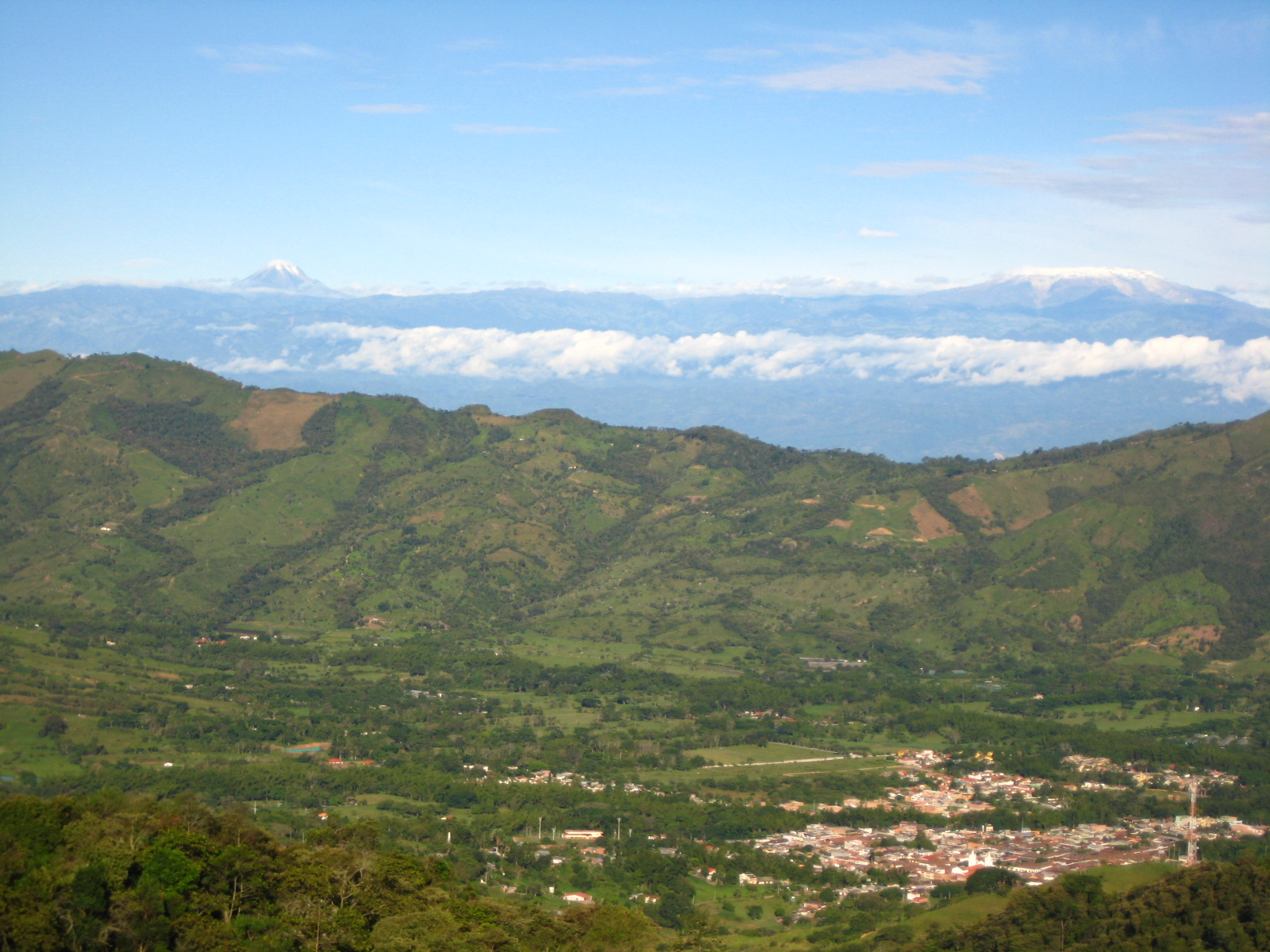

- Flag Coat of arms
- Nickname: Guaduas
- Motto: Confianza y Desarrollo
- Location of the town and municipality of Guaduas in Cundinamarca Department.

- Location in Colombia
- Coordinates: 5°4′10″N 74°35′53″W
- Country: Colombia
- Department: Cundinamarca
- Province: Bajo Magdalena
- Natural region: Andean Region
- Settled around: 1549
- Established: December 13, 1610
- Founded: December 27, 1644

Government
  - Type: Municipality
  - Mayor: Jhon Alexander Morera

Area
  - Municipality and town: 763.7 km^{2} (294.9 sq mi)
  - Urban: 8.51 km^{2} (3.29 sq mi)
- Elevation: 992 m (3,255 ft)

Population (2020 est.)
  - Municipality and town: 33,212
  - Density: 43.49/km^{2} (112.6/sq mi)
  - Urban: 15,862
  - Urban density: 1,860/km^{2} (4,830/sq mi)
- Demonym(s): guadeño, -ña (es)
- Website: http://www.villadeguaduas.gov.co

Guaduas (Spanish pronunciation: [ˈɡaðwas]) is a municipality and town in Colombia, in the Lower Magdalena Province department of Cundinamarca, about 117 km from Bogotá. It is an agricultural and tourist center of some importance with a population of about 33,000 in the municipality. Its name refers to a type of bamboo cane. It is one of the cities on the Bogotá-Medellín highway. Its main plaza is featured on the Colombian ten-thousand pesos bill, and is one of the seats of the Roman Catholic Diocese of La Dorada–Guaduas

== History ==
The early inhabitants of the "Valley of the Guaduas" were the indigenous Panche people. It was an important stop on the road from Santafé de Bogotá to Honda, located in a small, fertile valley. The town proper was founded on April 20, 1572 by Andrés Díaz Venero de Leiva. It was abandoned after its foundation until December 13, 1610, when Fray Tomas de Morales founded the Franciscan monastery of La Soledad on the same location. It was recognized officially as a villa on December 27, 1644 and formally re-founded by Francisco Pérez de Guzmán.

In 1696, Guaduas became a parish seat, thanks to a charter from King Charles II. The convent was closed around 1805. In 1809 Fray Domingo de Petres, a Capuchin architect who also directed the construction of the Cathedral of Bogotá, began building a church in the village. The original convent building was subsequently transformed into a prison by order of the Congress of Cucuta.

Guaduas was a center of botanical experimentation, which included the introduction of níspero trees from the West Indies in the late 18th century. The crop is now widely cultivated in the region.

The provincial constitution of 1815 upgraded Guaduas to a canton, which in turn was incorporated into the province of Bogotá in 1824. The town experienced rapid growth after that. The first official school was opened in 1833, the town acquired the status of provincial capital in 1857, four years later the local hospital was founded, and in 1871 it was connected to the national telegraph network.

In recognition of its historical significance, Guaduas was declared a Pueblo Patrimonio (heritage town) by the Colombian government in 2010. The municipal anthem's music and lyrics were written by Guaduas-born Miguel Raga Fernández in the mid-1940s.

== The 7 Wonders of Guaduas ==
In 2007, the school community of Guaduas picked 7 of the locality's most notable features or locations:

- Salavarrieta Policarpa House Museum House where Policarpa Salavarrieta was born and lived.
- Convento de la Soledad Currently houses the municipal government, Simon Bolívar and Antonio Nariño are known to have stayed here. Built by Father Thomas Morales on December 13, 1610, this was the town's first colonial building.
- Aboriginal settlement Located 22 km from the town. Archaeological pieces that date from about 200 BC C., fossilized stones and other samples are still routinely found here.
- Mirador Piedra Capira Overlook point that covers much of the region, including the snow-covered Magdalena Ruiz, Santa Isabel and Tolima.
- waterfall of VersallesThis beautiful natural site is located in the municipality of Guaduas. Three currents converge in falls of more than 20 meters in the place known as Versailles.
- Navarro bridge Inaugurated on January 16, 1899 and declared a National Monument on May 10, 1994 for its technical and aesthetic merits and relevance in national history as well as an example of engineering in Colombia.
- Puerto Gallot Located 3 km from the Inspectorate of Puerto Bogota, the first river port in the new Kingdom of Granada. Well-preserved colonial buildings.

== Geology ==
The Maastrichtian-Paleocene Guaduas Formation is named after Guaduas.

== Born in Guaduas ==
- Policarpa Salavarrieta, national heroine
- Joaquín Acosta, geologist and historian
- Francisco Javier Matis Painter and botanist born in Guaduas, in 1774, died in Bogota, in 1851. As a child, Francisco Javier Matiz showed skill for painting. On December 15, 1783, the wise naturalist José Celestino Mutis linked

== Development Organizations ==
- Colombian Growth Alliance in Guaduas
