= Panche people =

Panche
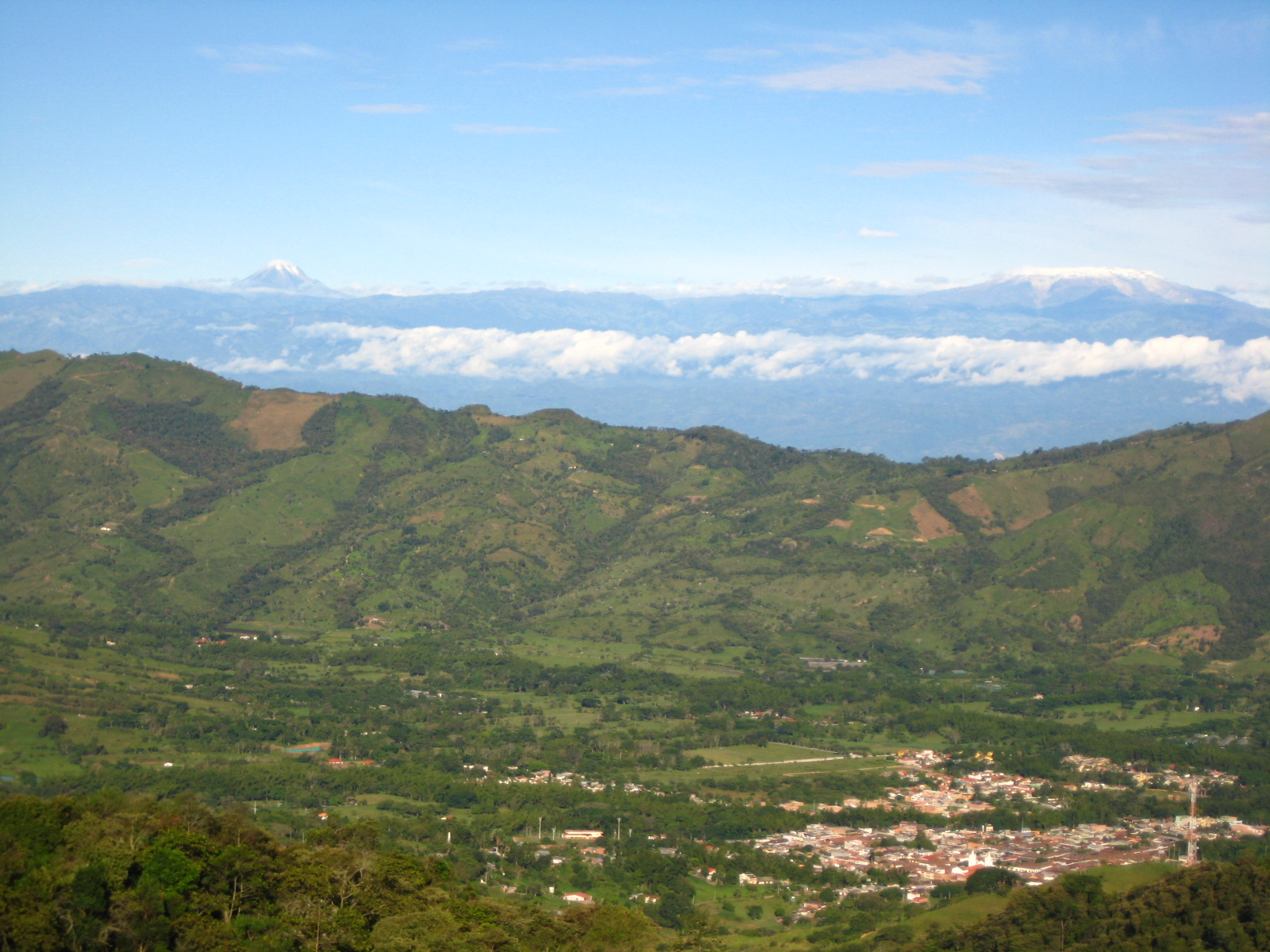
- Guaduas, northernmost territory of the Panche view of the Nevado del Ruiz volcano

Total population
- 30,000 (1537)

Regions with significant populations
- Cundinamarca, Tolima, Colombia

Languages
- Panche, Colombian Spanish

Religion
- Traditional religion, Catholicism

Related ethnic groups
- Muzo, Muisca, Sutagao, Pijao

The Panche or Tolima are an indigenous group of people that lived in what is now Colombia. They inhabited the southwestern parts of the department of Cundinamarca and the northeastern areas of the department of Tolima, close to the Magdalena River. At the time of the Spanish conquest, more than 30,000 Panche were living in what would become the New Kingdom of Granada. Early knowledge about the Panche has been compiled by scholar Pedro Simón.

== Panche territory ==
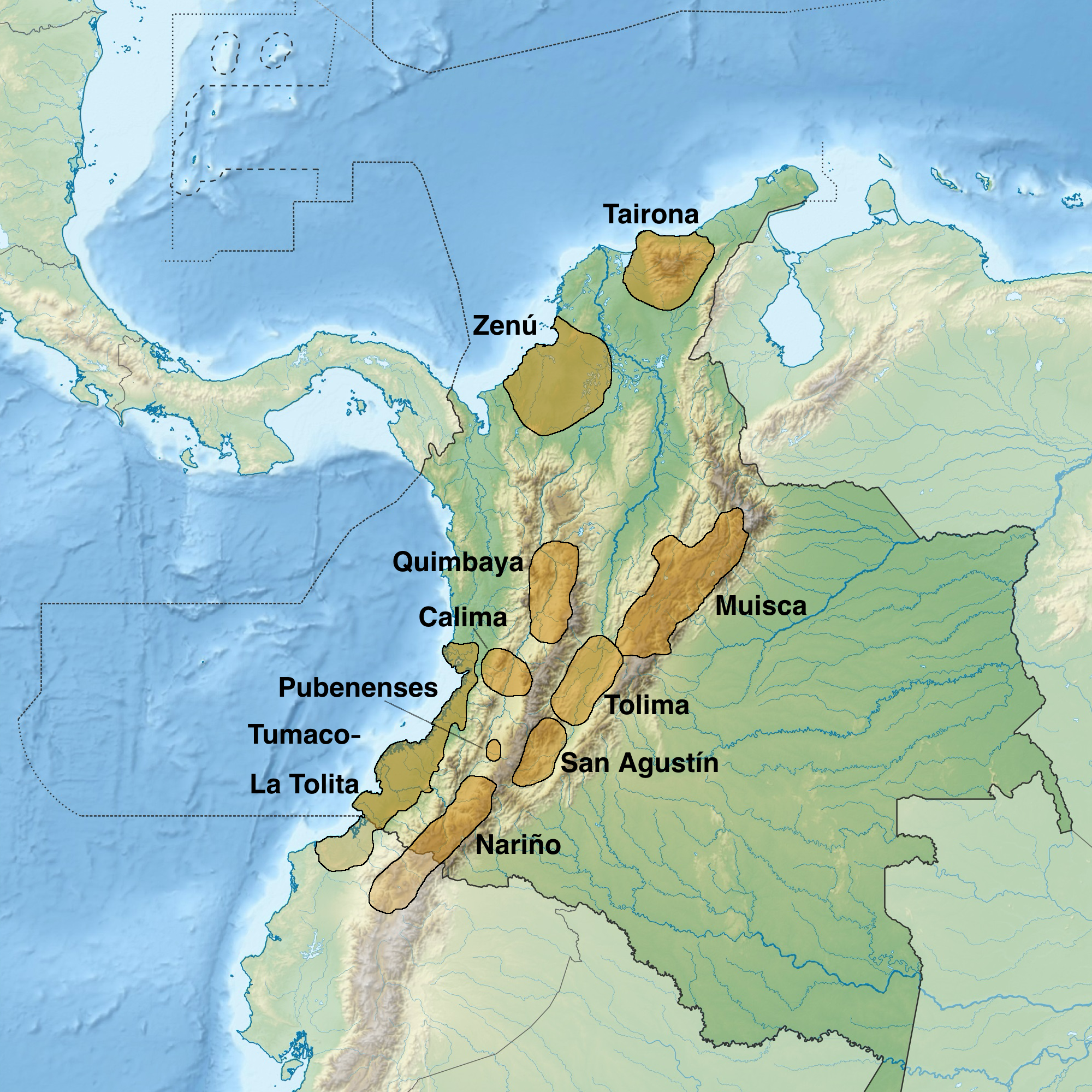
Map of pre-Columbian civilizations. The Panche and Pijao are grouped as Tolima

The Panche were inhabiting the lower altitude southwestern areas of the Cundinamarca department, close to the Magdalena River. Their northern neighbours were the Muzo in the northeast and the Pantágora in the northwest, in the east the Muisca, in the southeast the Sutagao and to the south and southwest the Pijao. The northern limits were defined by the Río Negro and the Guarinó River and the southern limits the Coello and Fusagasugá Rivers.

The Panche people were organized in a loose confederation with different subgroups whose names still remain as municipalities of Cundinamarca.

=== Municipalities belonging to Panche territories ===
Name	Department	Altitude (m) urban centre	Map
Albán	Cundinamarca	2245	
Anapoima	Cundinamarca	710	
Anolaima	Cundinamarca	1657	
Apulo	Cundinamarca	420	
Beltrán	Cundinamarca	235	
Bituima	Cundinamarca	1627	
Cachipay	Cundinamarca	1600	
Chaguaní	Cundinamarca	1200	
El Colegio	Cundinamarca	990	
Girardot	Cundinamarca	326	
Guaduas	Cundinamarca	992	
Guataquí	Cundinamarca	227	
Guayabal de Síquima	Cundinamarca	1630	
La Mesa	Cundinamarca	1200	
Nilo	Cundinamarca	336	
Nimaima	Cundinamarca	1085	
Nocaima	Cundinamarca	1105	
Pulí	Cundinamarca	1270	
Quipile	Cundinamarca	2012	
Ricaurte	Cundinamarca	284	
San Juan de Rioseco	Cundinamarca	1303	
Sasaima	Cundinamarca	1203	
Tibacuy (disputed with the zipa of the Muisca)	Cundinamarca	1647	
Tocaima	Cundinamarca	400	
Vianí	Cundinamarca	1498	
Viotá	Cundinamarca	567	
Ambalema	Tolima	241	
Honda	Tolima	229	
Mariquita	Tolima	495	

== Description ==
The Panche were a strong group of warriors who fought numerous battles with the neighbouring Muisca. They walked partially naked and were ornamented with earrings, feathers and golden pieces.

The Panche hunted and fought wars with their enemies using sticks and clubs and poisoned arrows. They used poison of spiders and snakes for their arrows.

Petroglyphs of the Panche were discovered in Tibacuy, Viotá, El Colegio, Cachipay, Albán, Sasaima. Rock paintings have been found in Tibacuy.

Like other indigenous peoples of the Americas, such as the Guane, the Panche performed cranial deformation.

According to Pedro Simón, the Panche performed cannibalism on parts of their conquered enemies. Some sources state they ate everything except for the heads, which they hung in their bohíos. However, later research by various researchers has found no evidence for cannibalism and attribute the cannibalistic ideas to the Spanish conquistadores.

In terms of their burial practices, the Panches differed from their neighbours that the dead were not oriented in a fixed position, like the Muisca with their heads to the east and the Muzo with their heads to the west.

== Language ==
The Panche language is extinct, and is unclassified due to lack of attestation.

== History ==
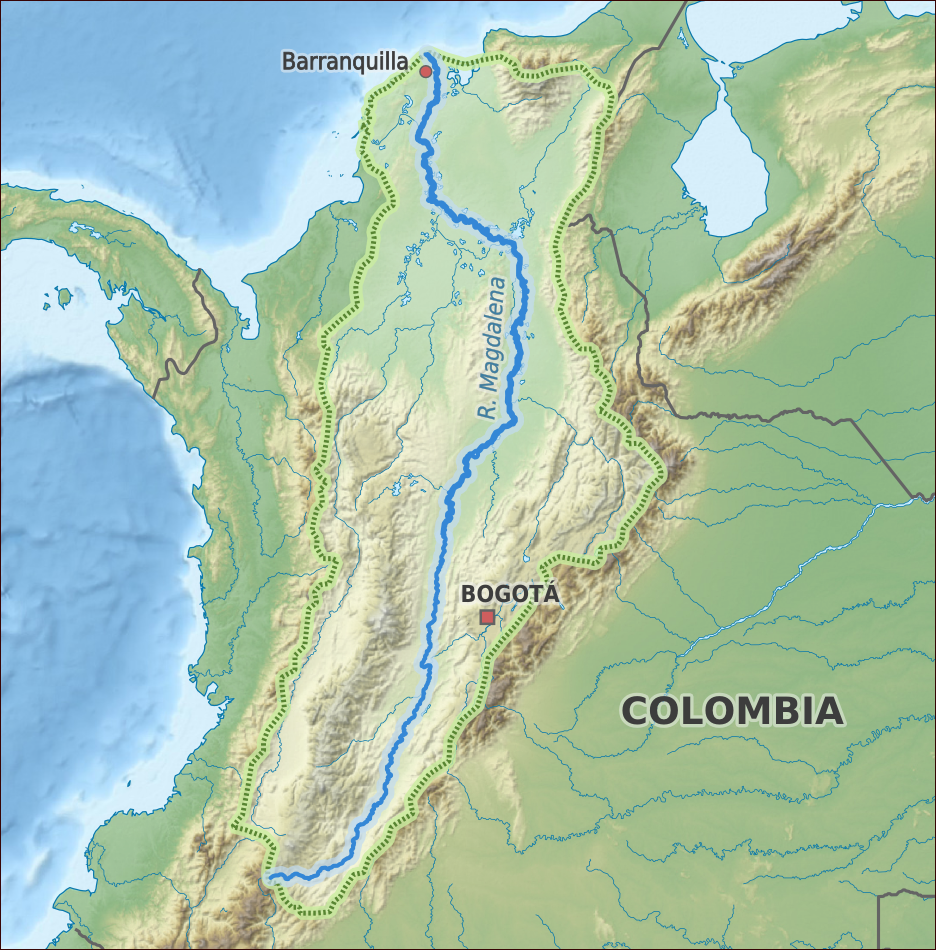
Magdalena River

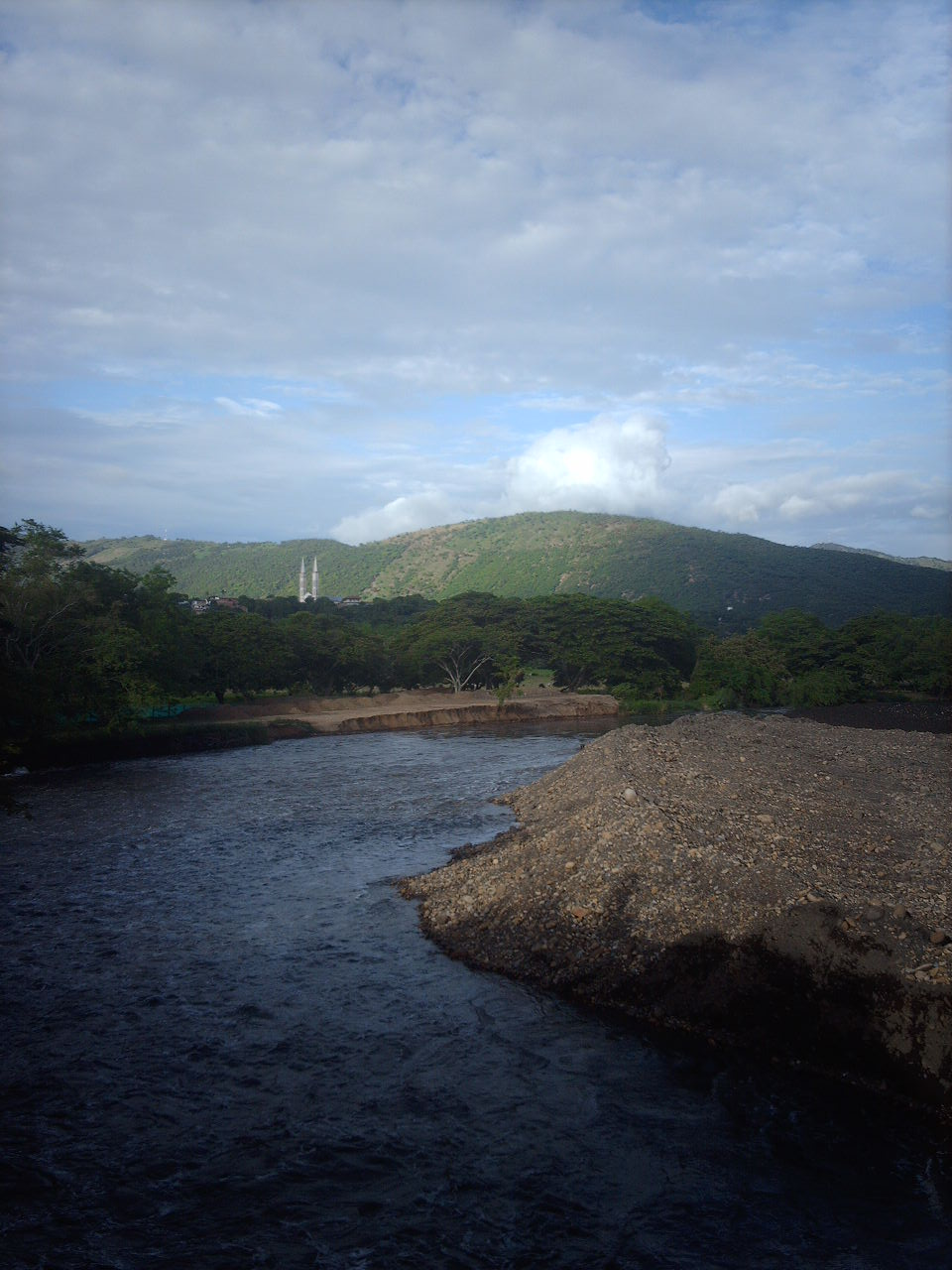
Bogotá River in Tocaima

The war-like Panche defended their terrain first against the Muisca and then against the Spanish and Muisca
The Magdalena River formed the western boundary of the Panche with the Pijao and Pantágora

The Panche civilization has been described from 300 AD onwards. Around the year 1000 migrations from the Caribbean coast of Colombia happened inward.

After the Spanish conquest and the installation of the New Kingdom of Granada, the Panche quickly diminished due to their resistance against the Spanish conquistadores. The first Spanish conquerors who invaded the Panche territories were Juan de Céspedes and Alonso de San Martín. Later conquest was performed by Hernán Venegas Carrillo.

More than 2000 artefacts from the Panche are stored in the Museo del Oro in Bogotá.

=== 1543–44 - Expedition Hernán Venegas Carrillo ===
Name	Department	Date	Year	Note(s)	Map
Bituima	Cundinamarca	15 August	1543		
Chaguaní	Cundinamarca		1543		
Apulo	Cundinamarca	5 January	1544		
Tocaima	Cundinamarca	20 March	1544		

== See also ==
- Muisca
- Muzo
- Pijao, Sutagao
- Colombian mythology
- Indigenous peoples in Colombia

== Bibliography ==
- Francis, John Michael (1993), "Muchas hipas, no minas" The Muiscas, a merchant society: Spanish misconceptions and demographic change (M.A.) (M.A.), University of Alberta, pp. 1–118
- Martínez, Ángel (2005), Los Panches - Los inconquistables Panches del Magdalena - The Panche - the unconquerable Panches of the Magdalena River (in Spanish), Liliana Pérez Illera, Ángel Martínez T & MJ Editores, pp. 1–207, ISBN 9789589760703, OL 13072896M
- De Perdomo, Lucia R. (1975), Excavacaciones arqueológicas en zona Panche - Guaduas, Cundinamarca - Archaeological excavations in the Panche area - Guaduas, Cundinamarca (PDF) (in Spanish), pp. 247–289, archived from the original (PDF) on 2016-06-11
