= Chaguaní =

- Municipality and town
- Flag Coat of arms

- Location of the municipality and town inside Cundinamarca Department of Colombia

- Location in Colombia
- Coordinates: 4°56′55″N 74°35′37″W
- Country: Colombia
- Department: Cundinamarca
- Province: Central Magdalena

Area
  - Total: 142 km^{2} (55 sq mi)
- Elevation: 1,200 m (3,900 ft)

Population (2015)
  - Total: 3,981
  - Density: 28.0/km^{2} (72.6/sq mi)
- Time zone: UTC-5 (Colombia Standard Time)

Chaguaní (Spanish pronunciation: [tʃaɣwaˈni]) is a municipality and town in the Central Magdalena Province of Cundinamarca Department in Colombia. It is 121 km (75 mi) from Bogotá.
