= Jerusalén, El Salvador =

Jerusalén
- District
- Location in El Salvador
- Coordinates: 13°39′N 88°54′W
- Country: El Salvador
- Department: La Paz
- Elevation: 1,909 ft (582 m)

Population (2024)
  - District: 2,586
  - Rank: 239th in El Salvador
  - Rural: 2,586

Jerusalén is a municipality in the La Paz department of El Salvador. It was founded by the Cordova family. They were Sephardi Jews who were expelled from Spain. It has a population of 3000

== See also ==
- Jerusalén, Cundinamarca
