= Albán, Cundinamarca =

Albán
- Municipality and town
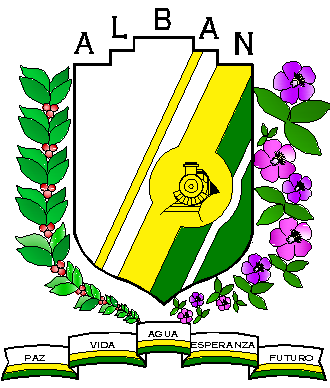
- Flag Coat of arms

- Location of the municipality and town inside Cundinamarca Department of Colombia

- Location in Colombia
- Coordinates: 4°52′42″N 74°26′18″W
- Country: Colombia
- Department: Cundinamarca
- Time zone: UTC-5 (Colombia Standard Time)

Albán is a municipality and town of Colombia in the department of Cundinamarca.

== Veredas ==
The municipality is divided into 14 veredas.

- Centro
- Chavarro
- Chimbe
- El Entable
- Garbanzal
- Guayacundo Alto
- Guayacundo Bajo
- Java
- Las Marías
- Los Alpes
- Namay Alto
- Namay Bajo
- Pantanillo
- San Rafael

== Climate ==
Climate data for Albán (Sta Teresa), elevation 2,200 m (7,200 ft), (1981–2010)
Month	Jan	Feb	Mar	Apr	May	Jun	Jul	Aug	Sep	Oct	Nov	Dec	Year
Mean daily maximum °C (°F)	19.0 (66.2)	19.2 (66.6)	19.1 (66.4)	18.9 (66.0)	18.8 (65.8)	18.5 (65.3)	18.4 (65.1)	19.1 (66.4)	19.2 (66.6)	18.9 (66.0)	18.5 (65.3)	18.6 (65.5)	18.8 (65.8)
Daily mean °C (°F)	15.4 (59.7)	15.6 (60.1)	15.6 (60.1)	15.6 (60.1)	15.7 (60.3)	15.4 (59.7)	15.3 (59.5)	15.6 (60.1)	15.7 (60.3)	15.6 (60.1)	15.4 (59.7)	15.3 (59.5)	15.5 (59.9)
Mean daily minimum °C (°F)	12.0 (53.6)	12.3 (54.1)	12.7 (54.9)	12.9 (55.2)	13.0 (55.4)	12.8 (55.0)	12.3 (54.1)	12.4 (54.3)	12.4 (54.3)	12.6 (54.7)	12.5 (54.5)	12.2 (54.0)	12.5 (54.5)
Average precipitation mm (inches)	90.9 (3.58)	109.5 (4.31)	132.5 (5.22)	143.0 (5.63)	133.5 (5.26)	79.0 (3.11)	52.2 (2.06)	55.8 (2.20)	94.4 (3.72)	168.5 (6.63)	152.8 (6.02)	120.4 (4.74)	1,316.8 (51.84)
Average precipitation days	13	14	18	19	18	16	15	13	14	19	18	17	193
Average relative humidity (%)	90	90	90	90	90	89	88	87	88	89	91	91	89
Source: Instituto de Hidrologia Meteorologia y Estudios Ambientales
