= Pulí, Cundinamarca =

Pulí
- Municipality and town
- Flag Seal

- Location of the municipality and town of Pulí inside the Cundinamarca department of Colombia

- Location in Colombia
- Coordinates: 4°41′N 74°43′W
- Country: Colombia
- Department: Cundinamarca
- Time zone: UTC-5 (Colombia Standard Time)

Pulí is a municipality and town of Colombia in the department of Cundinamarca.
