= El Colegio =

- Municipality and town
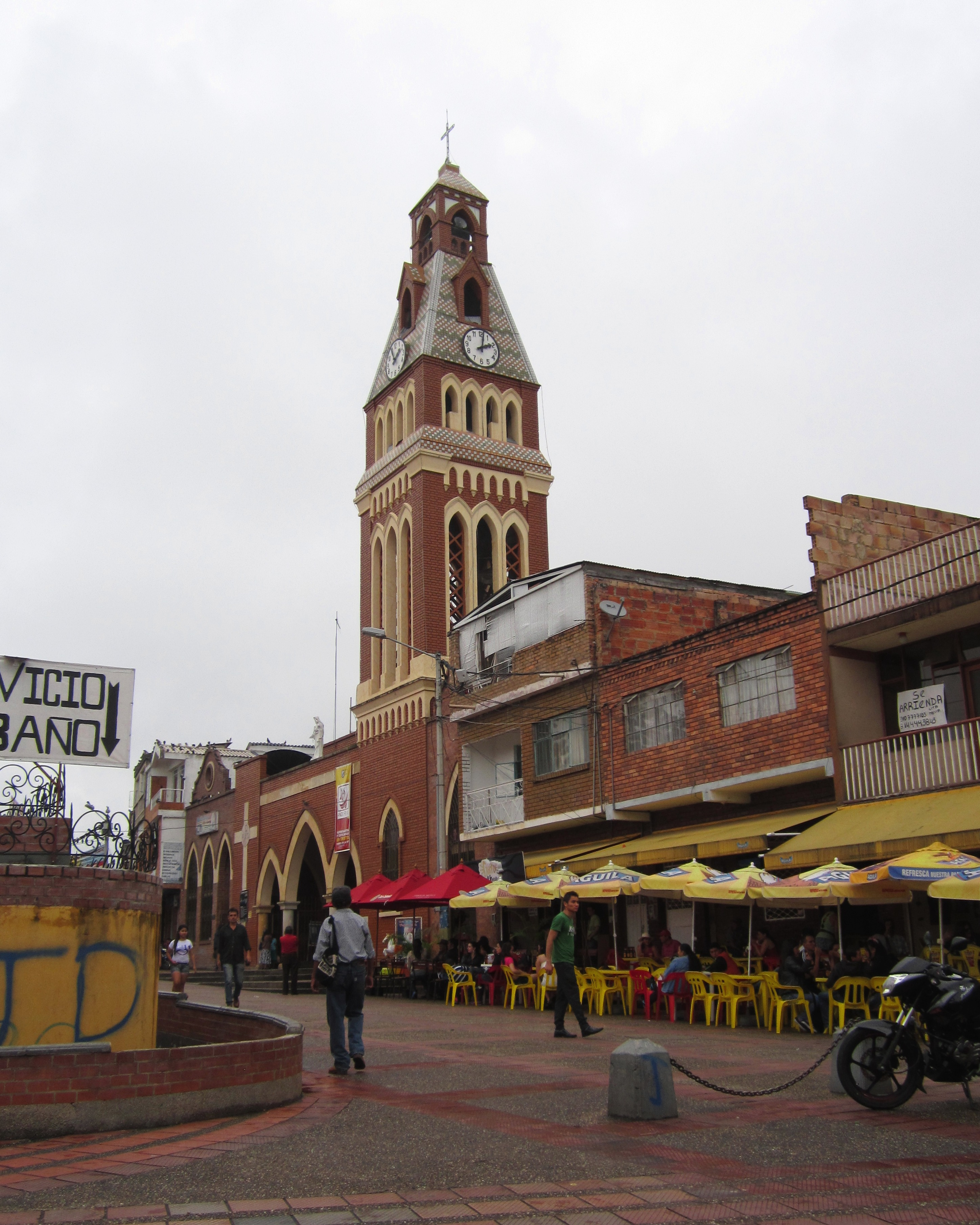

- Flag Coat of arms

- Location of the municipality and town inside Cundinamarca Department of Colombia

- Location in Colombia
- Coordinates: 4°34′51″N 74°26′33″W
- Country: Colombia
- Department: Cundinamarca

Area
  - Municipality and town: 118.3 km^{2} (45.7 sq mi)
  - Urban: 1.7 km^{2} (0.66 sq mi)
- Elevation: 990 m (3,250 ft)

Population (2018 census)
  - Municipality and town: 23,886
  - Density: 201.9/km^{2} (522.9/sq mi)
  - Urban: 10,251
  - Urban density: 6,000/km^{2} (16,000/sq mi)
- Time zone: UTC-5 (Colombia Standard Time)

El Colegio (Spanish pronunciation: [el koˈlexjo]) is a municipality and town of Colombia in the department of Cundinamarca.

== Climate ==
Climate data for El Colegio/Anapoima (Mercedes Las), elevation 810 m (2,660 ft), (1981–2010)
Month	Jan	Feb	Mar	Apr	May	Jun	Jul	Aug	Sep	Oct	Nov	Dec	Year
Mean daily maximum °C (°F)	30.7 (87.3)	30.8 (87.4)	30.5 (86.9)	29.8 (85.6)	29.6 (85.3)	29.9 (85.8)	30.5 (86.9)	31.3 (88.3)	31.3 (88.3)	29.9 (85.8)	29.4 (84.9)	29.6 (85.3)	30.3 (86.5)
Daily mean °C (°F)	25.3 (77.5)	25.4 (77.7)	25.2 (77.4)	24.7 (76.5)	24.7 (76.5)	24.8 (76.6)	25.1 (77.2)	25.8 (78.4)	25.6 (78.1)	24.9 (76.8)	24.5 (76.1)	24.7 (76.5)	25.1 (77.2)
Mean daily minimum °C (°F)	18.9 (66.0)	19.6 (67.3)	19.5 (67.1)	19.6 (67.3)	19.7 (67.5)	19.5 (67.1)	19.0 (66.2)	19.0 (66.2)	18.9 (66.0)	18.7 (65.7)	18.7 (65.7)	18.7 (65.7)	19.2 (66.6)
Average precipitation mm (inches)	70.4 (2.77)	97.8 (3.85)	128.1 (5.04)	127.9 (5.04)	138.6 (5.46)	45.7 (1.80)	36.9 (1.45)	46.2 (1.82)	96.5 (3.80)	141.6 (5.57)	147.8 (5.82)	90.8 (3.57)	1,168.3 (46.00)
Average precipitation days	9	11	14	17	17	12	12	10	12	17	15	12	154
Average relative humidity (%)	77	78	79	80	81	78	75	72	73	78	82	80	78
Mean monthly sunshine hours	182.9	146.8	133.3	126.0	133.3	138.0	158.1	155.0	141.0	145.7	147.0	167.4	1,774.5
Mean daily sunshine hours	5.9	5.2	4.3	4.2	4.3	4.6	5.1	5.0	4.7	4.7	4.9	5.4	4.9
Source: Instituto de Hidrologia Meteorologia y Estudios Ambientales

Climate data for El Colegio (Misione), elevation 1,540 m (5,050 ft), (1971–2000)
Month	Jan	Feb	Mar	Apr	May	Jun	Jul	Aug	Sep	Oct	Nov	Dec	Year
Mean daily maximum °C (°F)	24.5 (76.1)	24.3 (75.7)	24.4 (75.9)	23.7 (74.7)	23.4 (74.1)	23.5 (74.3)	23.8 (74.8)	24.2 (75.6)	24.3 (75.7)	23.4 (74.1)	23.3 (73.9)	23.8 (74.8)	23.9 (75.0)
Daily mean °C (°F)	19.9 (67.8)	19.9 (67.8)	20.1 (68.2)	19.7 (67.5)	19.7 (67.5)	19.7 (67.5)	19.9 (67.8)	20.1 (68.2)	20.1 (68.2)	19.4 (66.9)	19.4 (66.9)	19.5 (67.1)	19.8 (67.6)
Mean daily minimum °C (°F)	16.3 (61.3)	16.3 (61.3)	16.5 (61.7)	16.5 (61.7)	16.6 (61.9)	16.4 (61.5)	16.1 (61.0)	16.0 (60.8)	16.2 (61.2)	16.0 (60.8)	16.2 (61.2)	16.2 (61.2)	16.3 (61.3)
Average precipitation mm (inches)	105.1 (4.14)	109.8 (4.32)	152.0 (5.98)	190.6 (7.50)	135.0 (5.31)	67.0 (2.64)	48.8 (1.92)	59.1 (2.33)	109.0 (4.29)	181.1 (7.13)	199.8 (7.87)	120.2 (4.73)	1,477.5 (58.17)
Average precipitation days	13	14	17	20	21	18	15	16	17	21	19	14	204
Average relative humidity (%)	79	80	80	82	81	79	75	74	75	82	84	81	79
Mean monthly sunshine hours	139.5	107.4	102.3	87.0	83.7	93.0	114.7	108.5	108.0	99.2	93.0	120.9	1,257.2
Mean daily sunshine hours	4.5	3.8	3.3	2.9	2.7	3.1	3.7	3.5	3.6	3.2	3.1	3.9	3.4
Source: Instituto de Hidrologia Meteorologia y Estudios Ambientales
