= Jerusalén, Cundinamarca =

Jerusalén
- Municipality and town
- Flag Coat of arms

- Location of the municipality and town inside Cundinamarca Department of Colombia

- Location in Colombia
- Coordinates: 4°33′47″N 74°41′43″W
- Country: Colombia
- Department: Cundinamarca
- Elevation: 357 m (1,171 ft)
- Time zone: UTC-5 (Colombia Standard Time)

Jerusalén is a municipality and town of Colombia in the department of Cundinamarca.

== Climate ==
Climate data for Jerusalén, elevation 316 m (1,037 ft), (1981–2010)
Month	Jan	Feb	Mar	Apr	May	Jun	Jul	Aug	Sep	Oct	Nov	Dec	Year
Mean daily maximum °C (°F)	34.6 (94.3)	34.7 (94.5)	34.3 (93.7)	33.8 (92.8)	33.6 (92.5)	34.1 (93.4)	35.2 (95.4)	35.8 (96.4)	35.3 (95.5)	33.9 (93.0)	33.1 (91.6)	33.8 (92.8)	34.3 (93.7)
Daily mean °C (°F)	28.3 (82.9)	28.4 (83.1)	28.3 (82.9)	27.9 (82.2)	27.6 (81.7)	28.0 (82.4)	28.6 (83.5)	29.2 (84.6)	28.7 (83.7)	27.7 (81.9)	27.2 (81.0)	27.7 (81.9)	28.1 (82.6)
Mean daily minimum °C (°F)	21.2 (70.2)	21.5 (70.7)	22.0 (71.6)	22.2 (72.0)	22.0 (71.6)	21.6 (70.9)	21.3 (70.3)	22.0 (71.6)	22.0 (71.6)	21.8 (71.2)	21.8 (71.2)	21.4 (70.5)	21.7 (71.1)
Average precipitation mm (inches)	49.5 (1.95)	73.5 (2.89)	101.2 (3.98)	151.7 (5.97)	128.8 (5.07)	46.3 (1.82)	34.4 (1.35)	44.3 (1.74)	100.0 (3.94)	134.8 (5.31)	95.1 (3.74)	55.5 (2.19)	1,002 (39.4)
Average precipitation days	8	8	10	14	13	8	7	7	11	14	12	8	117
Average relative humidity (%)	68	68	69	70	72	70	65	62	66	72	75	72	69
Source: Instituto de Hidrologia Meteorologia y Estudios Ambientales

== See also ==
- Jerusalén, El Salvador
