= La Mesa, Cundinamarca =

La Mesa
- Municipality and town
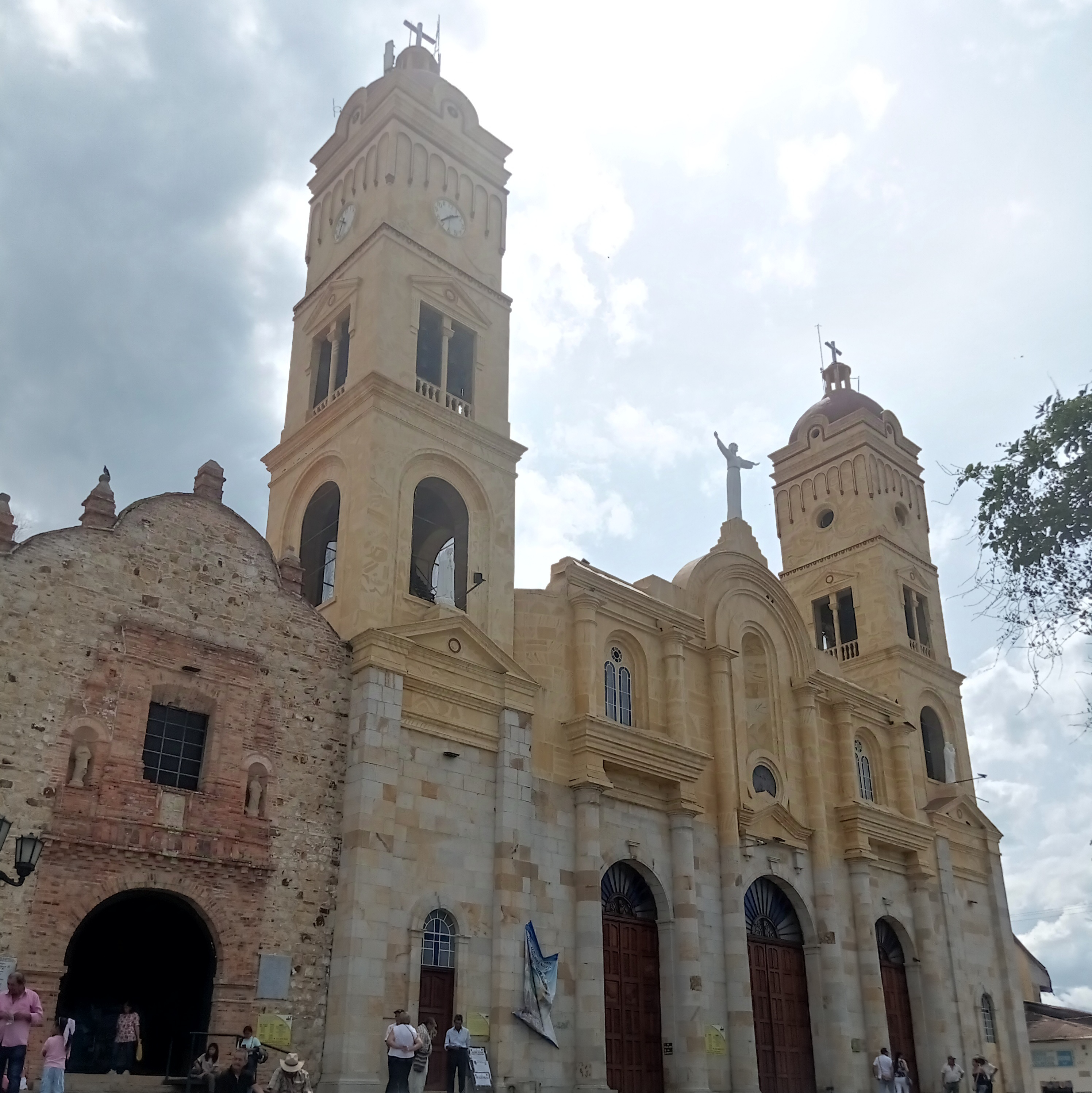
- Church of La Mesa

- Flag Coat of arms
- Nickname: La Mesa de Juan Díaz
- Localization in Cundinamarca, in Colombia
- Coordinates: 4°37′49″N 74°27′45″W
- Country: Colombia
- Department: Cundinamarca
- Province: Tequendama Province
- Founded: 12 March 1777
- Founder: Ramón Ibáñez, Laureano de Rojas & Joaquín de Lis

Government
  - Mayor: Humberto Segura Barragán (2020-2023)

Area
  - Municipality and town: 148.2 km^{2} (57.2 sq mi)
  - Urban: 3.89 km^{2} (1.50 sq mi)
- Elevation: 1,200 m (3,900 ft)

Population (2018 census)
  - Municipality and town: 32,694
  - Density: 220.6/km^{2} (571.4/sq mi)
  - Urban: 16,854
  - Urban density: 4,330/km^{2} (11,200/sq mi)
- Time zone: UTC-5 (Colombia Standard Time)
- Website: Official website

La Mesa (Spanish pronunciation: [la ˈmesa]) is a municipality and town of Colombia in the Tequendama Province of the department of Cundinamarca. The urban centre is located 65 kilometres (40 mi) from Bogotá.

== Geography ==
Its name ("The Table" in Spanish) comes from its geographical position, located on the top of a plateau with an area of 14 km^{2} (2.5 sq mi) in the centre of the Eastern Ranges of the Colombian Andes.

== History ==
Before the Spanish conquest of the Muisca, the area was inhabited by the Panche who were notable warriors and defeated by an alliance of the Spanish conquistadors and the zipa Sagipa in the Battle of Tocarema on August 20, 1538.

This town is famed for the Botanical Expedition on the New Kingdom of Granada which commenced from there in 1783 led by the biologist José Celestino Mutis. The expedition researched local fauna and flora. It was also an important trade centre during the 19th and part of the 20th century.

Originally La Mesa was located a short distance from its present location and was known as Guayabal. But because of lack of water and too much mud, it was moved in 1777 by order of Pedro Messia de la Zerda, Manuel Guirior and Manuel Antonio Flórez, Spanish Viceroys. The town centre was located the Main Plaza (Downtown), next to the Carbonera river, today an underground river. The original location had 98 houses and nowadays is now known by the name of Dos Caminos, (Two Roads in Spanish).

The population of La Mesa was part of the Independence from Spain movement. From there started the first military campaign of July 20 of 1810 independence revolution. Approximately 50 men and later 300 more went to Bogotá on the day after the declaration of independence to be part of the disposition of the Supreme Board of the independence. La Mesa became a training centre for army soldiers who fought for the independence cause. At La Mesa many heroes were trained, who later were killed defending their ideals by the Spanish troops, some were killed in the middle of the Main Plaza.

Four times, the liberator Simón Bolivar passed by, in the years of 1821, 1826, 1828 and 1830. Antonio Nariño transited in September 1813 commanding the Cundinamarca army of the South campaign of the Independence cause.

== Climate ==
Its position over the East Mountain Range produces an unusual meteorological phenomenon which consists of a dense fog.

This fog is the product of the low and heavy cloud movements, that in the Magdalena Valley, They are caused by warm air forced to rise by the cooler air around Bogotá. On clear days is possible to see the snow-covered Nevado del Tolima and Ruiz volcanoes. The Santa Isabel snow hills, located to the west and the Magdalena River opposite the Central Mountain Range can also be seen.

The year round average temperature is 24 °C (75 °F)

== Paleontology ==
Fossil remains of Eonatator coellensis were found in La Mesa and described in 2013.

== Born in La Mesa ==
- Karen Castiblanco, professional tennis player
- Nelly Garzón Alarcón (1932–2019), nurse, teacher

== Gallery ==
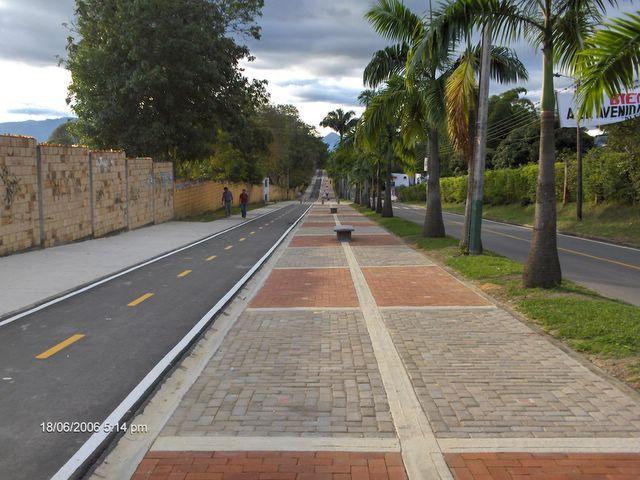
Street in front of the stadium and the Francisco Julian Olaya school

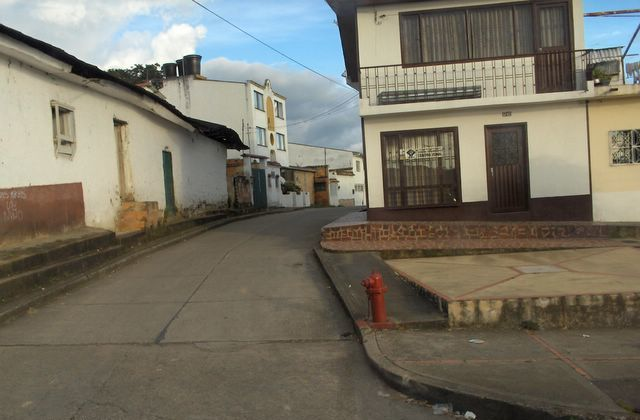
7th street

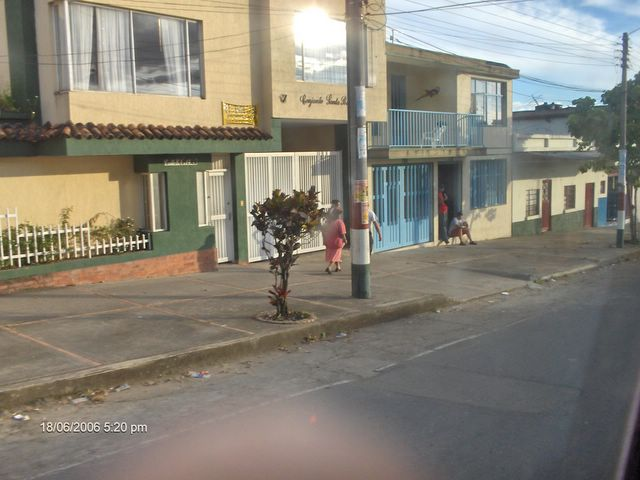
7th street

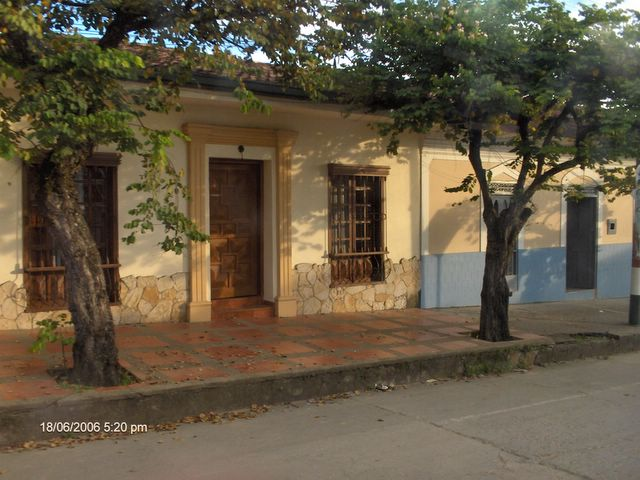
Beautiful house on the 7th street

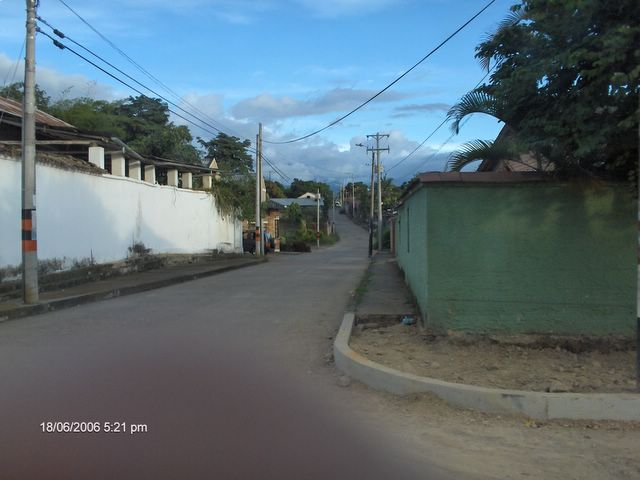
Other streets

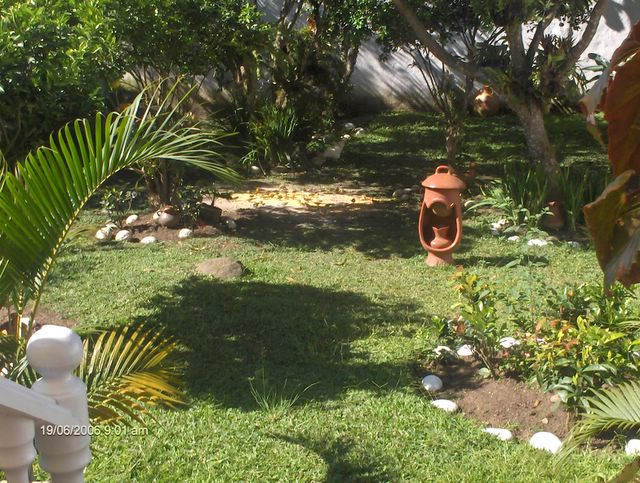
Typical backyard
