= Anolaima =

- Municipality and town

- Flag Coat of arms

- Location of the municipality and town inside Cundinamarca Department of Colombia

- Location in Colombia
- Coordinates: 4°45′42.26″N 74°27′50.46″W
- Country: Colombia
- Department: Cundinamarca
- Elevation: 1,657 m (5,436 ft)

Population (Census 2018)
  - Total: 12,204
- Time zone: UTC-5 (Colombia Standard Time)

Anolaima (Spanish pronunciation: [anoˈlajma]) is a municipality and township of Colombia in the department of Cundinamarca. It is located in the providence of Tequendama at 71 km (44 mi) West from Bogotá in between the cities of Facatativá and La Mesa.

Anolaima is known as the Fruit Capital of Colombia, its temperate climate allows an ongoing growth of all kind of fruits that are harvested from the coldest to the warmest temperatures in Colombia.

== Brief history ==
Anolaima was first discovered by a European in 1538 - Gonzalo Jiménez de Quesada. The "Anolaymas" were the Indian native of the Panche Tribe. They were one of the first tribes found by the Spaniards that descended from the region of Zipacón and Bogotá savanna. Conqueror Gonzalo Jiménez de Quezada, who led the expedition, was defeated in 1538 at the Battle of Tocarema.

== Tourism ==
The celebration of Corpus Christi (Latin for "Body of Christ") and the Peasant's Day is conducted every year around the first holiday weekend of June. Normally, it is held the first Thursday after Trinity Sunday. Its celebration on a Thursday is meant to associate it with institution by Jesus of the Eucharist during the Last Supper. In Anolaima this celebration commences usually on Friday ending it the following Monday honoring the peasants and/or farmers of the region with food, prices and trophies. All the farmers collect the best fruits and vegetables from their farms to build huge designs or sculptures shape like animals or people-like figures made of fruits, seeds, vegetables and even life animals. The best sculpture or arch wins the best trophy that is given to the farmers the last day during "El Dia del campesino" (Peasant's day).

During the Corpus Christi festival, music bands, dance groups, and orchestras perform salsa, merengue, and vallenato throughout the celebrations. On Sunday morning, a procession is held in which school marching bands and military bands take part, and a Eucharistic celebration takes place in the main square

The Corpus in Anolaima was held on June 12, 13, 14 of 2010.

== Born in Anolaima ==
- Julio Ernesto Bernal, former professional cyclist
- Daniel Camargo Barbosa, serial killer

== Climate ==
Climate data for Anolaima, elevation 1,726 m (5,663 ft), (1971–2000)
Month	Jan	Feb	Mar	Apr	May	Jun	Jul	Aug	Sep	Oct	Nov	Dec	Year
Mean daily maximum °C (°F)	23.3 (73.9)	23.5 (74.3)	23.5 (74.3)	22.5 (72.5)	22.5 (72.5)	22.5 (72.5)	23.0 (73.4)	22.8 (73.0)	23.3 (73.9)	22.8 (73.0)	22.4 (72.3)	23.6 (74.5)	23.0 (73.3)
Mean daily minimum °C (°F)	15.4 (59.7)	15.7 (60.3)	16.0 (60.8)	15.3 (59.5)	15.7 (60.3)	15.4 (59.7)	15.6 (60.1)	15.6 (60.1)	15.6 (60.1)	15.6 (60.1)	15.6 (60.1)	15.5 (59.9)	15.6 (60.1)
Average precipitation mm (inches)	83.0 (3.27)	83.0 (3.27)	82.0 (3.23)	167.0 (6.57)	151.0 (5.94)	88.0 (3.46)	51.0 (2.01)	48.0 (1.89)	100.0 (3.94)	198.0 (7.80)	144.0 (5.67)	114.0 (4.49)	1,309 (51.54)
Average relative humidity (%)	81	78	79	83	81	78	74	71	70	80	85	85	79
Source: FAO

Climate data for Anolaima (Florida La), elevation 1,915 m (6,283 ft), (1981–2010)
Month	Jan	Feb	Mar	Apr	May	Jun	Jul	Aug	Sep	Oct	Nov	Dec	Year
Mean daily maximum °C (°F)	21.0 (69.8)	21.1 (70.0)	21.0 (69.8)	20.7 (69.3)	20.6 (69.1)	20.6 (69.1)	20.5 (68.9)	20.9 (69.6)	21.1 (70.0)	20.6 (69.1)	20.3 (68.5)	20.5 (68.9)	20.8 (69.4)
Daily mean °C (°F)	16.9 (62.4)	17.0 (62.6)	17.0 (62.6)	16.9 (62.4)	17.0 (62.6)	16.8 (62.2)	16.7 (62.1)	17.1 (62.8)	17.0 (62.6)	16.8 (62.2)	16.7 (62.1)	16.7 (62.1)	16.9 (62.4)
Mean daily minimum °C (°F)	13.1 (55.6)	13.4 (56.1)	13.6 (56.5)	13.9 (57.0)	13.8 (56.8)	13.6 (56.5)	13.3 (55.9)	13.3 (55.9)	13.6 (56.5)	13.6 (56.5)	13.4 (56.1)	13.1 (55.6)	13.5 (56.3)
Average precipitation mm (inches)	75.0 (2.95)	89.7 (3.53)	113.9 (4.48)	152.0 (5.98)	123.8 (4.87)	54.9 (2.16)	44.2 (1.74)	61.5 (2.42)	103.9 (4.09)	172.6 (6.80)	149.3 (5.88)	90.0 (3.54)	1,230.7 (48.45)
Average precipitation days	10	11	14	17	16	13	11	11	13	19	16	12	162
Average relative humidity (%)	88	89	88	89	89	87	87	85	86	88	90	89	88
Mean monthly sunshine hours	114.7	90.3	80.6	66.0	71.3	81.0	96.1	108.5	105.0	80.6	69.0	102.3	1,065.4
Mean daily sunshine hours	3.7	3.2	2.6	2.2	2.3	2.7	3.1	3.5	3.5	2.6	2.3	3.3	2.9
Source: Instituto de Hidrologia Meteorologia y Estudios Ambientales

Climate data for Anolaima (Primavera D Matima), elevation 1,850 m (6,070 ft), (1981–2010)
Month	Jan	Feb	Mar	Apr	May	Jun	Jul	Aug	Sep	Oct	Nov	Dec	Year
Mean daily maximum °C (°F)	21.3 (70.3)	21.4 (70.5)	21.3 (70.3)	21.1 (70.0)	20.9 (69.6)	20.6 (69.1)	20.5 (68.9)	21.3 (70.3)	21.6 (70.9)	21.1 (70.0)	20.7 (69.3)	20.9 (69.6)	21.0 (69.8)
Daily mean °C (°F)	17.5 (63.5)	17.6 (63.7)	17.5 (63.5)	17.6 (63.7)	17.6 (63.7)	17.4 (63.3)	17.2 (63.0)	17.5 (63.5)	17.7 (63.9)	17.5 (63.5)	17.2 (63.0)	17.4 (63.3)	17.5 (63.5)
Mean daily minimum °C (°F)	13.7 (56.7)	14.0 (57.2)	14.2 (57.6)	14.5 (58.1)	14.5 (58.1)	14.2 (57.6)	13.8 (56.8)	13.8 (56.8)	14.1 (57.4)	14.1 (57.4)	14.1 (57.4)	13.8 (56.8)	14.1 (57.4)
Average precipitation mm (inches)	56.0 (2.20)	70.8 (2.79)	107.9 (4.25)	113.0 (4.45)	92.2 (3.63)	47.1 (1.85)	34.7 (1.37)	41.5 (1.63)	77.1 (3.04)	120.1 (4.73)	118.6 (4.67)	71.9 (2.83)	913.6 (35.97)
Average precipitation days	8	11	14	15	14	11	11	10	11	15	15	11	140
Average relative humidity (%)	82	83	84	84	84	83	83	80	81	83	84	83	83
Source: Instituto de Hidrologia Meteorologia y Estudios Ambientales
