= Suárez River =

Suárez River Guane: Saravita
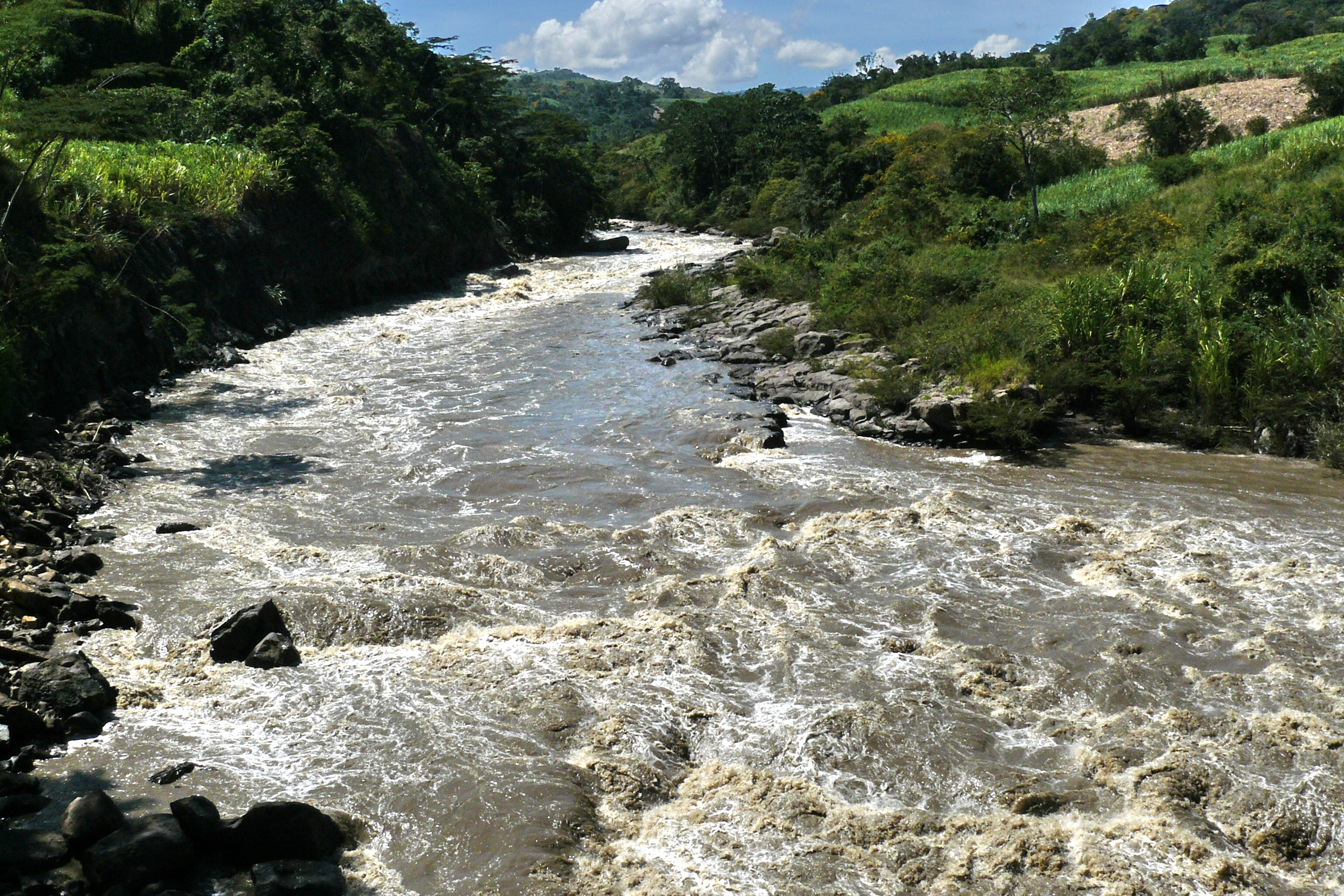
- Suárez River close to Barbosa

- Location of the Suárez River in Colombia
- Etymology: Gonzalo Suárez Rendón
- Native name: Río Suárez (Spanish)

Location
- Country: Colombia
- Department: Cundinamarca, Boyacá, Santander
- Provinces: Ubaté, Western Boyacá, Ricaurte, Vélez, Comunera, Guanentá
- Municipalities: Fúquene, San Miguel de Sema, Chiquinquirá, Saboyá, Puente Nacional, Barbosa, Moniquirá, Güepsa, San José de Pare, Santana, San Benito, Suaita, El Guacamayo, Guadalupe, Contratación, Chima, Guapotá, Palmas del Socorro, Socorro, Simacota, San Gil, Palmar, Cabrera, Barichara, Galán, Zapatoca, Villanueva

Physical characteristics
- Source: Lake Fúquene
  - location: Fúquene
  - coordinates: 5°29′11.9″N 73°46′07.8″W
  - elevation: 2,537.72 m (8,325.9 ft)
- Mouth: Sogamoso River
  - location: Villanueva
  - coordinates: 6°46′06.7″N 73°11′54.9″W
  - elevation: 700 m (2,300 ft)
- Length: 172 km (107 mi)
- Basin size: 98,230 km^{2} (37,930 sq mi)
- Discharge
  - location: Saboyá
  - average: 8 m^{3}/s (280 cu ft/s)
  - minimum: 1 m^{3}/s (35 cu ft/s)
  - maximum: 12 m^{3}/s (420 cu ft/s)

Basin features
- River system: Sogamoso River; Magdalena Basin; Caribbean Sea
- Tributaries
  - left: Susa, Simijaca, Chiquinquirá
  - right: Lenguazaque, Q. Aguaclara, Moniquirá, Ubasa, Fonce
- Waterbodies: Lake Fúquene

The Suárez River, originally Saravita, is a river in the Eastern Ranges of the Colombian Andes. The river originates in Lake Fúquene on the border of Cundinamarca and Boyacá and its mouth is the confluence with the Chicamocha River, forming the Sogamoso River in Santander. It is part of the Magdalena Basin flowing towards the Caribbean Sea.

The 172 kilometres (107 mi) long river is one of the longest on the Altiplano Cundiboyacense and forms the natural borders of Cundinamarca and Boyacá and Boyacá and Santander in its upstream and downstream part respectively. The river formed the trajectory for the Spanish conquest of the Muisca, when the conquistadors went uphill into the Andes from the tropical lowlands of Barrancabermeja in the north. The difference in altitude along the river course, from 2,538 metres (8,327 ft) at the source to 700 metres (2,300 ft) at its mouth, in its 98,230 square kilometres (37,930 sq mi) large basin causes climatic variations, especially with respect to precipitation. The frequent floodings of the river have given the Suárez River its name; conquistador Gonzalo Suárez Rendón tried to cross the river in one of his conquest expeditions, but the sudden flooding made his horse drown in the Suárez River.

== Etymology ==
The Suárez River is named after conquistador Gonzalo Suárez Rendón, after his horse drowned in the river when it experienced sudden flooding. The original name in Chibcha, given by the Guane was Saravita, meaning "departs from here".

== Description ==
The Suárez River is 172 kilometres (107 mi) long and its drainage basin extends over 98,230 square kilometres (37,930 sq mi), of which 34,825.6 square kilometres (13,446.2 sq mi) in Santander. It is sourced by Lake Fúquene in Boyacá at an altitude of 2,540 metres (8,330 ft) and forms together with the Chicamocha River the Sogamoso River in Santander at an altitude of 700 metres (2,300 ft). The river starts on the Altiplano Cundiboyacense where it forms the boundary between Cundinamarca and Boyacá and for a major part of its course downstream it is the natural boundary between Boyacá and Santander. The Suárez River is the only outlet of Lake Fúquene.

In Chiquinquirá, it meets the Chiquinquirá River, and in Puente Nacional Quebrada Aguaclara. In Barbosa, the Suárez River meets the Moniquirá River and in Moniquirá the Ubasa River. West of San Gil, the Fonce River flows into the Suárez River and in Villanueva the Chicamocha River and the Suárez River form the Sogamoso River together.

Source and end of the Suárez River on the Altiplano Cundiboyacense	Start and mouth of the Suárez River in the Santander Department

=== Climate ===
Other headwaters are the Lenguazaque River, Ráquira River, Ubaté River, Susa River, Simijaca River and Cucunubá. Nearby Lake Suesca has an endorheic basin, not flowing out to the Suárez River. Around Saboyá, the climate is very wet, with more than 2,400 millimetres (94 in) of rain per year, while its source, Lake Fúquene only receives 1,000 millimetres (39 in) per year. The discharge registered in Saboyá varies between 1 and 12 cubic metres per second (35 and 424 cu ft/s) with maximum values in May and minimum values in January.

=== Vegetation ===
In Saboyá, various flora surrounding the Suárez River have been registered, among others Inga sp., Croton funckianus, Mircyanthes sp., Gynerium saggitattum, tropical smoke bush (Euphorbia cotinifolia), castorbeans (Ricinus communis), Alchornea sp., Colombian oaks (Quercus humboldtii), Eucalyptus globulus and Cupressus sp., Pinus sp. and Acacia sp.

== History ==
The Suárez River is of importance in the history of Colombia, as it formed the fluvial artery that the conquistadors followed after they left the tropical lowlands of La Tora, present-day Barrancabermeja, uphill towards the Muisca Confederation. The Spanish conquerors followed the course of the Suárez river on the left bank until reaching Lake Fúquene. When Gonzalo Jiménez de Quesada and his greatly reduced troops arrived at the lake, the lake levels were estimated to have been 10 to 15 metres (33 to 49 ft) higher than in 1950.

== Tourism ==
- Every year in early January, in Barbosa, a festival is held on one of the many river beaches. At this festival Miss Tanga is elected.
- San Gil is a tourist hotspot, famous for its water sports, that happens mostly on the Fonce River, but also on the Suárez River.

== Image gallery ==
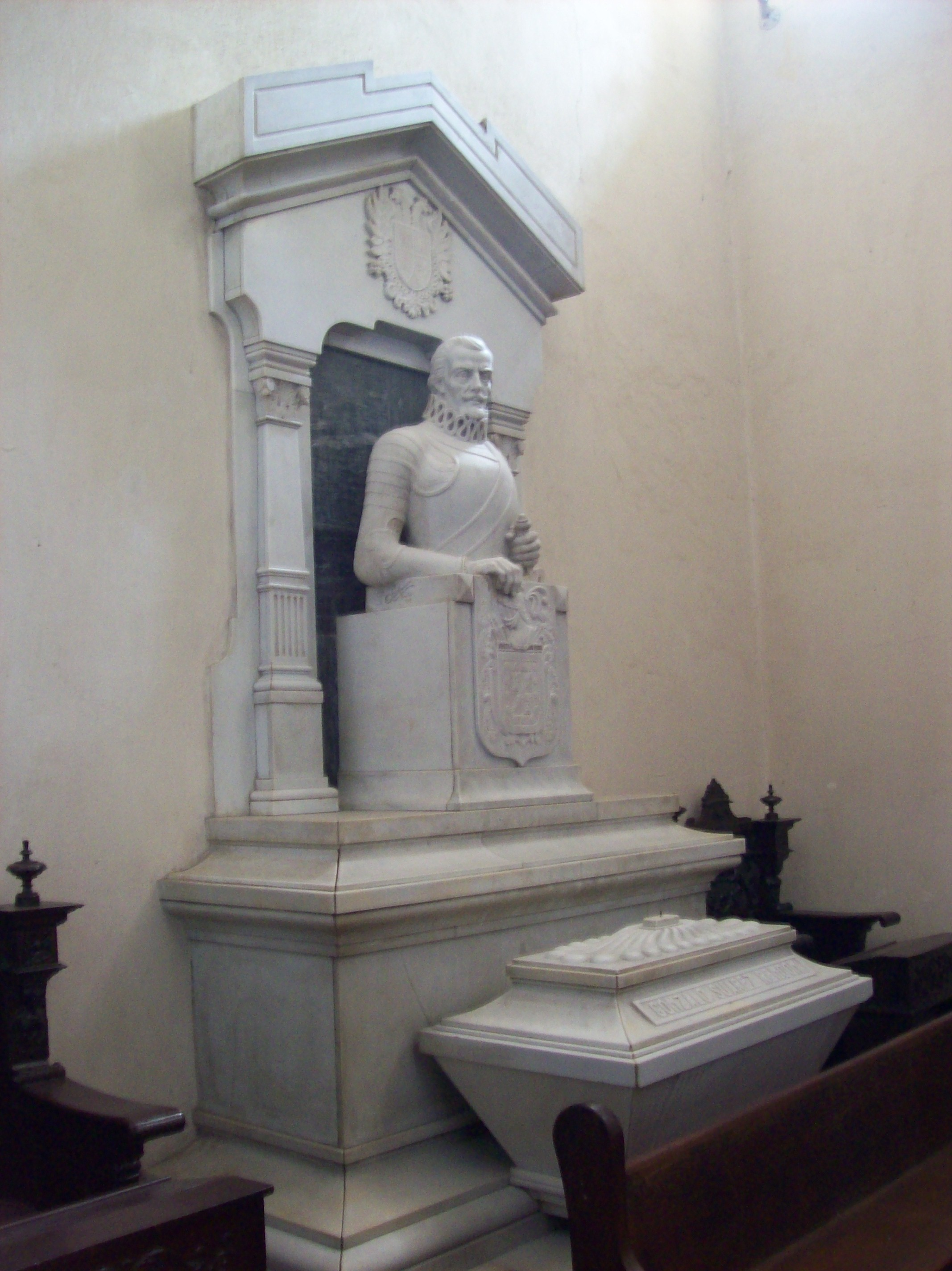
Tomb of Gonzalo Suárez Rendón in Tunja, namesake of the river

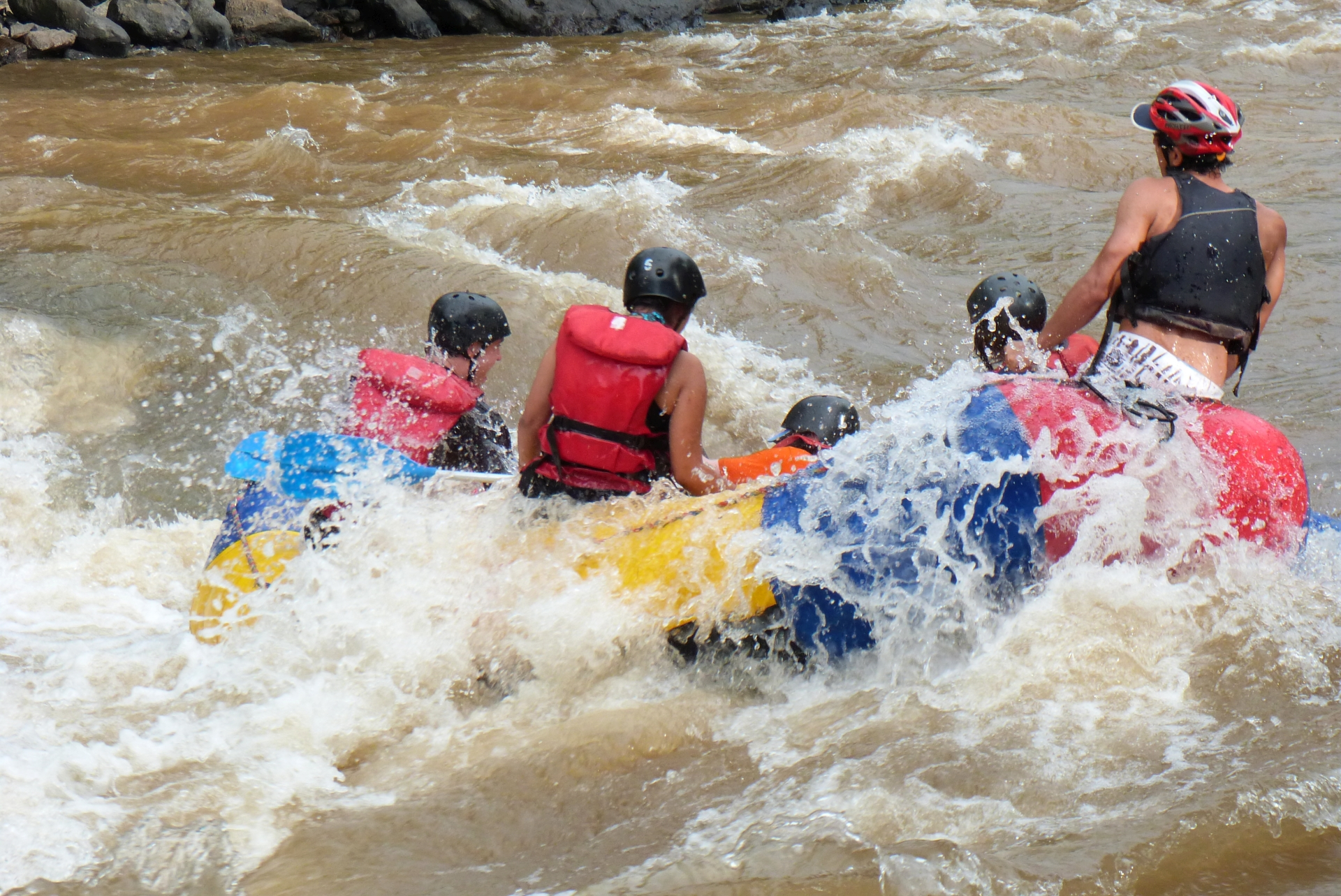
Rafting in San Gil

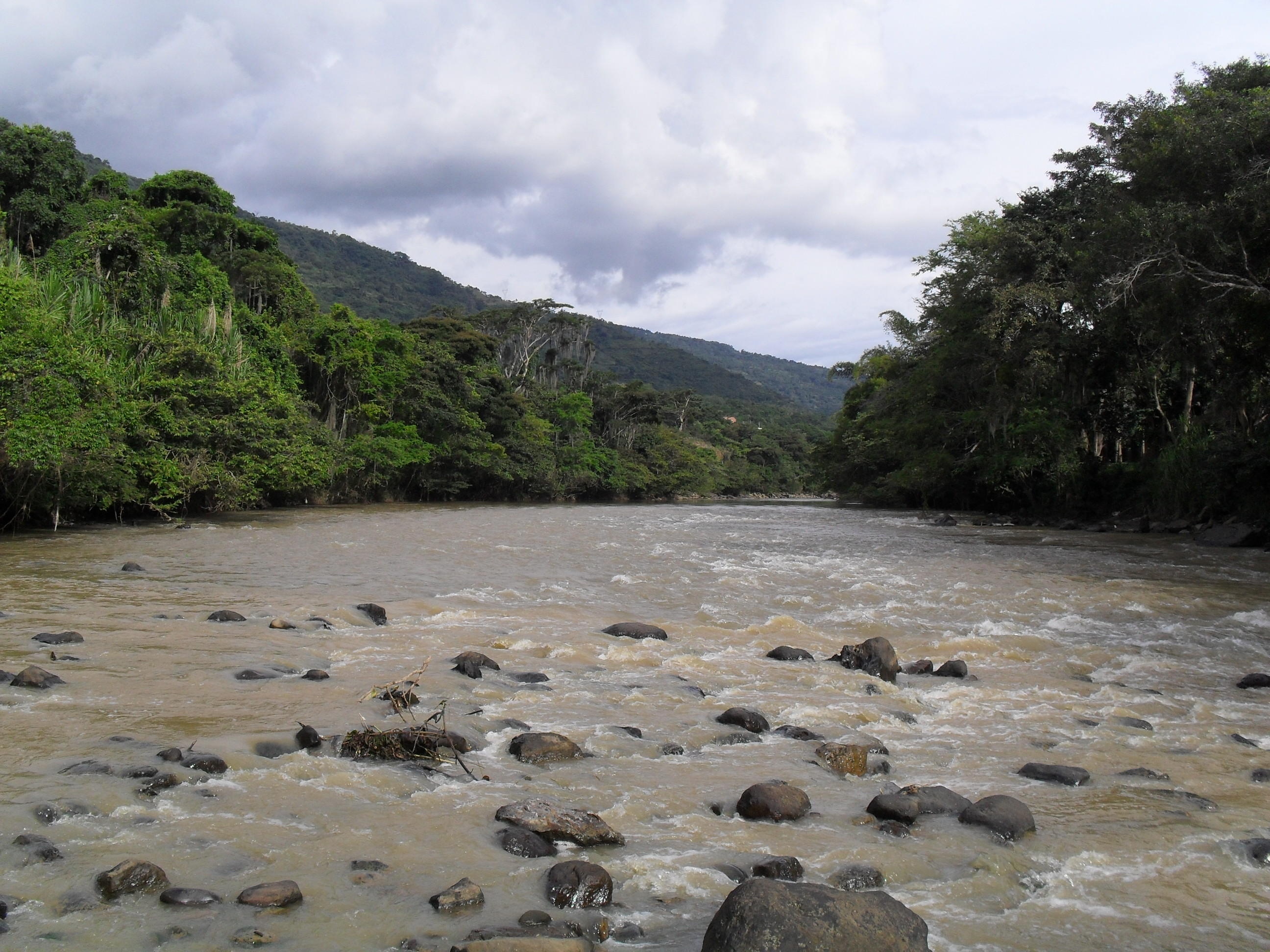
Río Fonce near San Gil

== See also ==
- List of rivers of Colombia
- Altiplano Cundiboyacense
- Chicamocha Canyon
