= Altiplano Cundiboyacense =

Plateau in the Colombian Andes

- Plateau
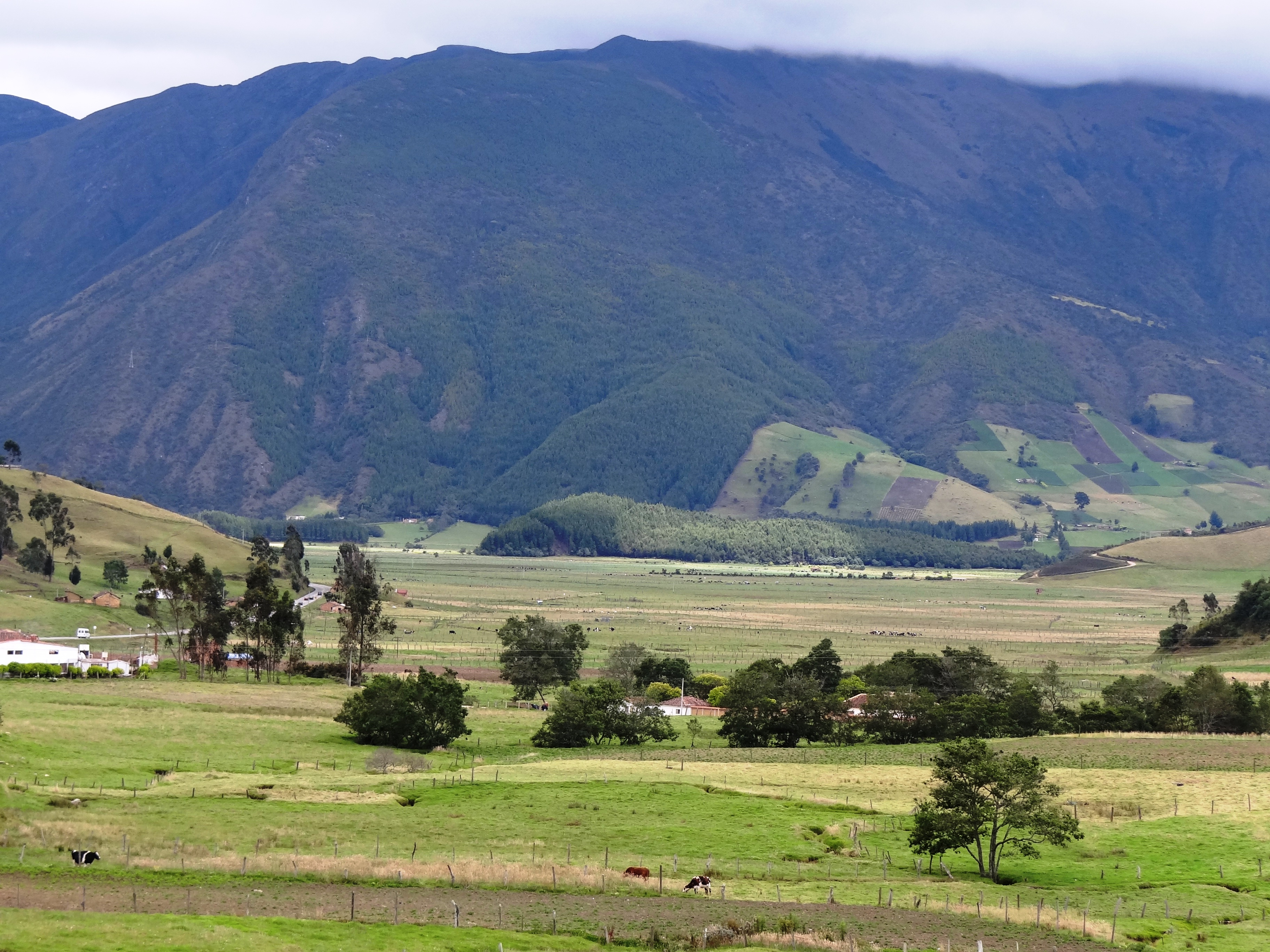
- Typical landscape of the Altiplano, near Arcabuco, Boyacá

- Location within Colombia
- Coordinates: 5°25′08″N 73°25′17″W
- Location: Bogotá, Cundinamarca & Boyacá; Colombia
- Range: Andes
- Part of: Eastern Ranges
- Water bodies: Water bodies
- Age: Miocene-recent
- Orogeny: Andean
- Geology: Geology

Area
  - Total: 25,000 km^{2} (9,700 sq mi)
- Elevation: 2,600 m (8,500 ft)
- Highest elevation: 4,000 m (13,000 ft)
- Volcanic field: Paipa-Iza volcanic complex
- Last eruption: Late Pliocene

The Altiplano Cundiboyacense (Spanish pronunciation: [altiˈplano kundiβoʝaˈsense]) is a high plateau located in the Eastern Cordillera of the Colombian Andes covering parts of the departments of Cundinamarca and Boyacá. (Do not confuse with The Altiplano or the Altiplano Nariñense, both further south.) The altiplano corresponds to the ancient territory of the Muisca. The Altiplano Cundiboyacense comprises three distinctive flat regions; the Bogotá savanna, the valleys of Ubaté and Chiquinquirá, and the valleys of Duitama and Sogamoso. The average altitude of the altiplano is about 2,600 metres (8,500 ft) above sea level but ranges from roughly 2,500 metres (8,200 ft) to 4,000 metres (13,000 ft).

== Etymology ==
Altiplano in Spanish means "high plain" or "high plateau". The second part of the name is a combination of the names of the departments of Cundinamarca and Boyacá.

== Geography ==
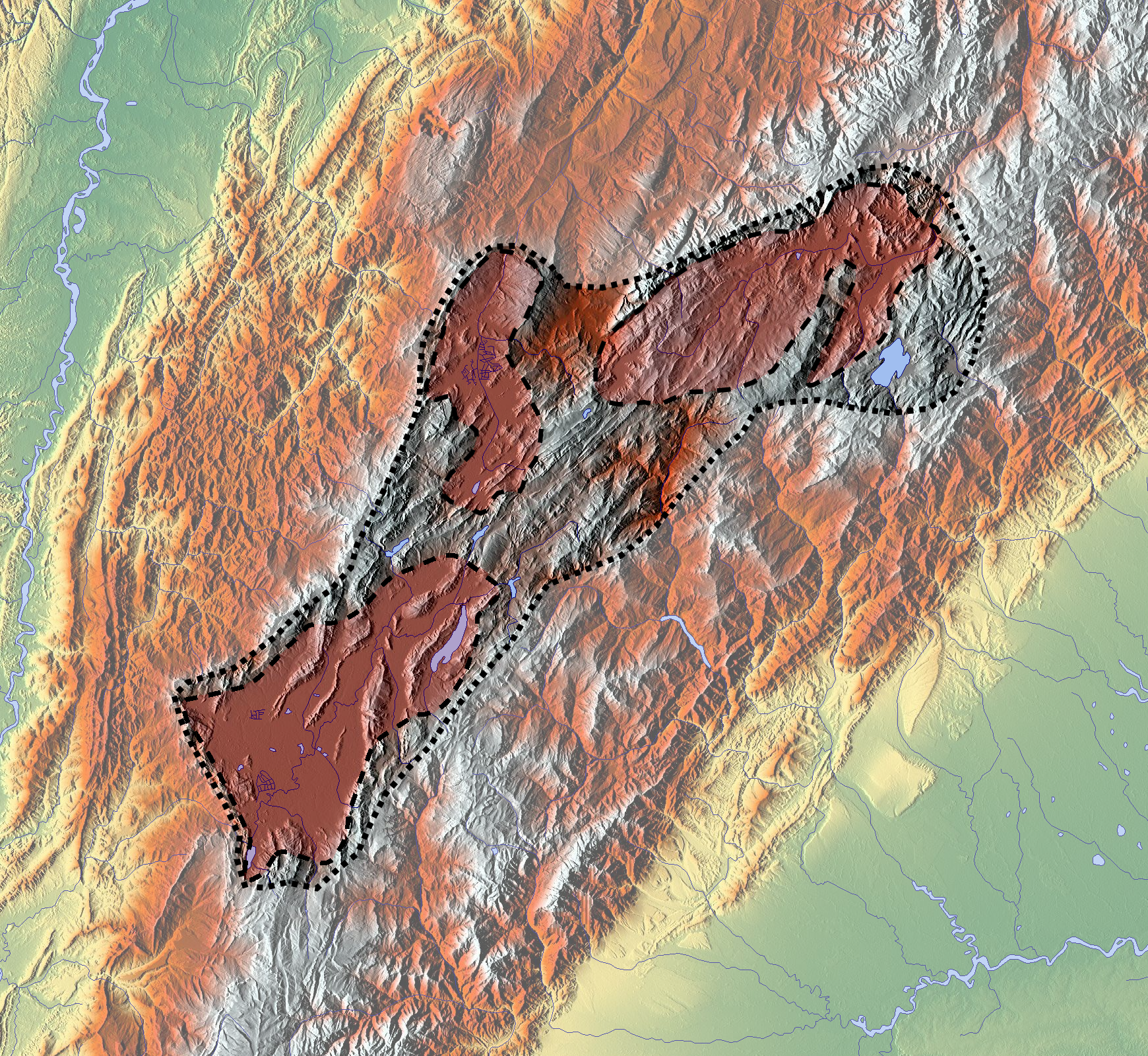
Subdivision of the Altiplano, from NE to SW: • Duitama-Sogamoso Iraca Valley • Ubaté-Chiquinquirá Valley • Bogotá savanna

The limits of the Altiplano are not strictly defined. The high plateau is enclosed by the higher mountains of the Eastern Ranges, with the Sumapaz mountains in the south and Chingaza to the east. The Tenza Valley is located to the east of the Altiplano and the Ocetá Páramo and Chicamocha Canyon are situated to the northeast.

=== Subdivision ===
The Altiplano is subdivided into three major valleys, from northeast to southwest:

- Iraca Valley
- Ubaté & Chiquinquirá Valley
- Bogotá savanna

=== Climate ===
The average temperature on the Altiplano Cundiboyacense is 14 °C (57 °F), ranging from 0 °C (32 °F) to 24 °C (75 °F). The driest months of the year are from December to March, while rain is more common in April, May, September, October and November. From June to August strong winds are present. Hail is common on the Altiplano.

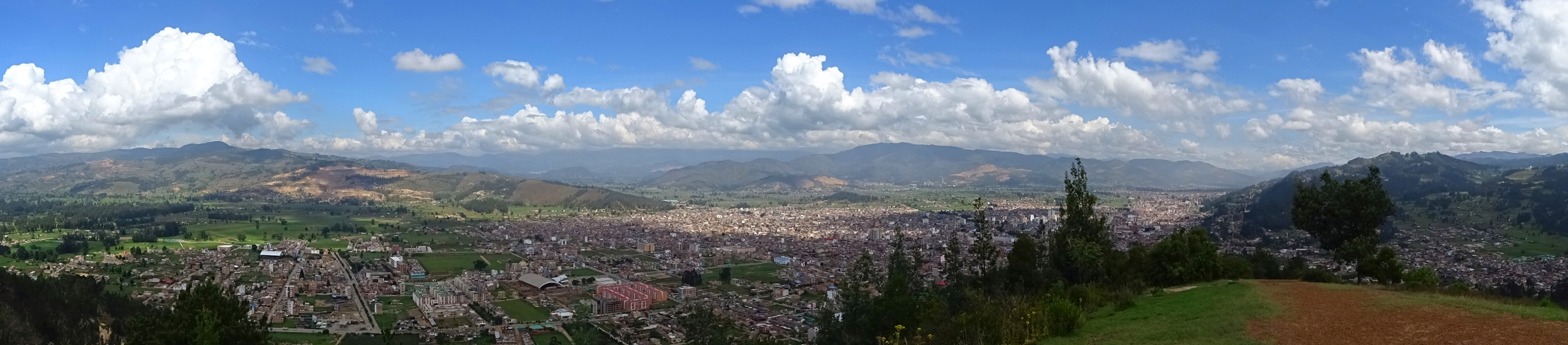
Panorama of the Iraca Valley of Sogamoso (foreground)–Duitama (left)

=== Páramos ===
The Altiplano Cundiboyacense is surrounded by and contains various Andean unique ecosystems; páramos. 60% of all páramos in the world are situated in Colombia. (Specifically, in the department of Boyacá with the most relative area of páramos). Boyacá is the department where 18.3% of the national total area is located. To the south the Sumapaz Páramo (largest in the world) forms a natural boundary of the Altiplano. Chingaza contains páramo vegetation, as does the most beautiful Ocetá Páramo in the northeast. On the Altiplano the microclimate of the surroundings of Lake Iguaque produces a páramo.

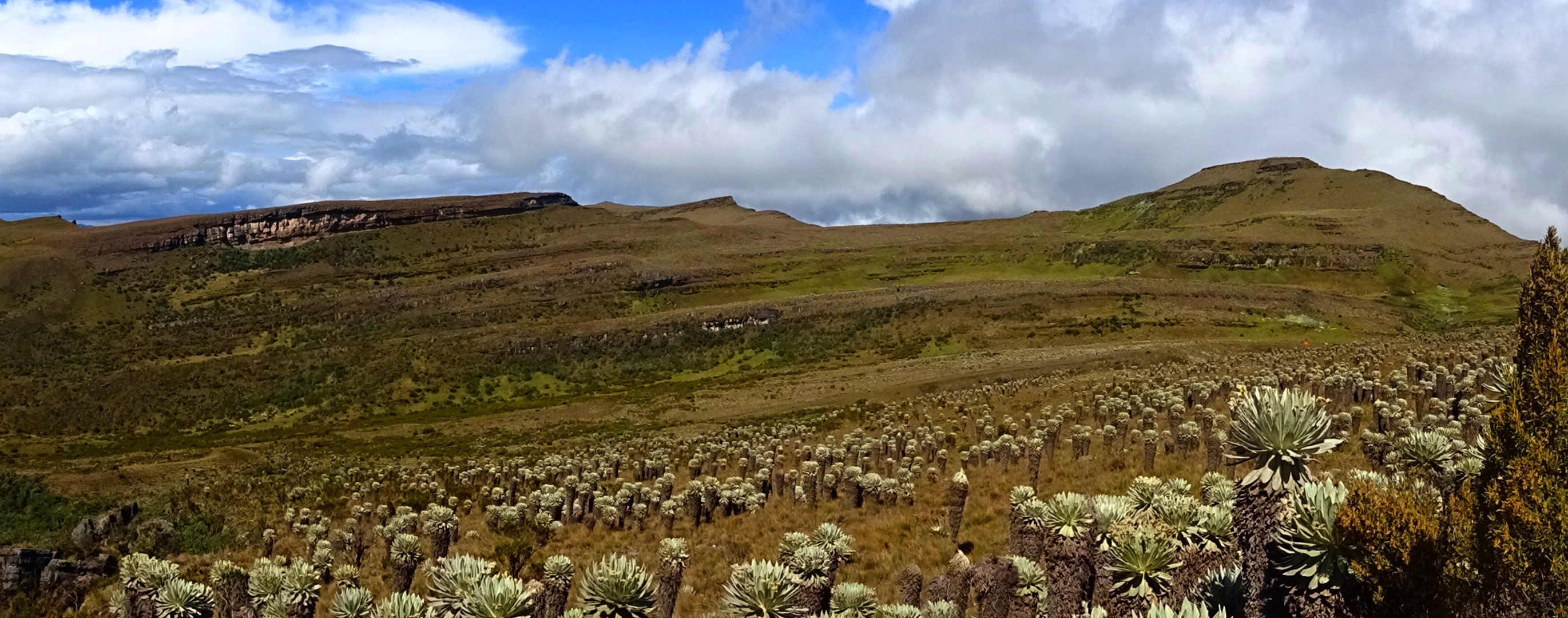
Panorama of the Playa de los Frailejones on the Ocetá Páramo

Regional geology

== History ==
=== Prehistory ===
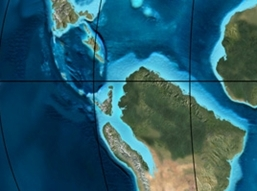
Northern South America around 90 Mya

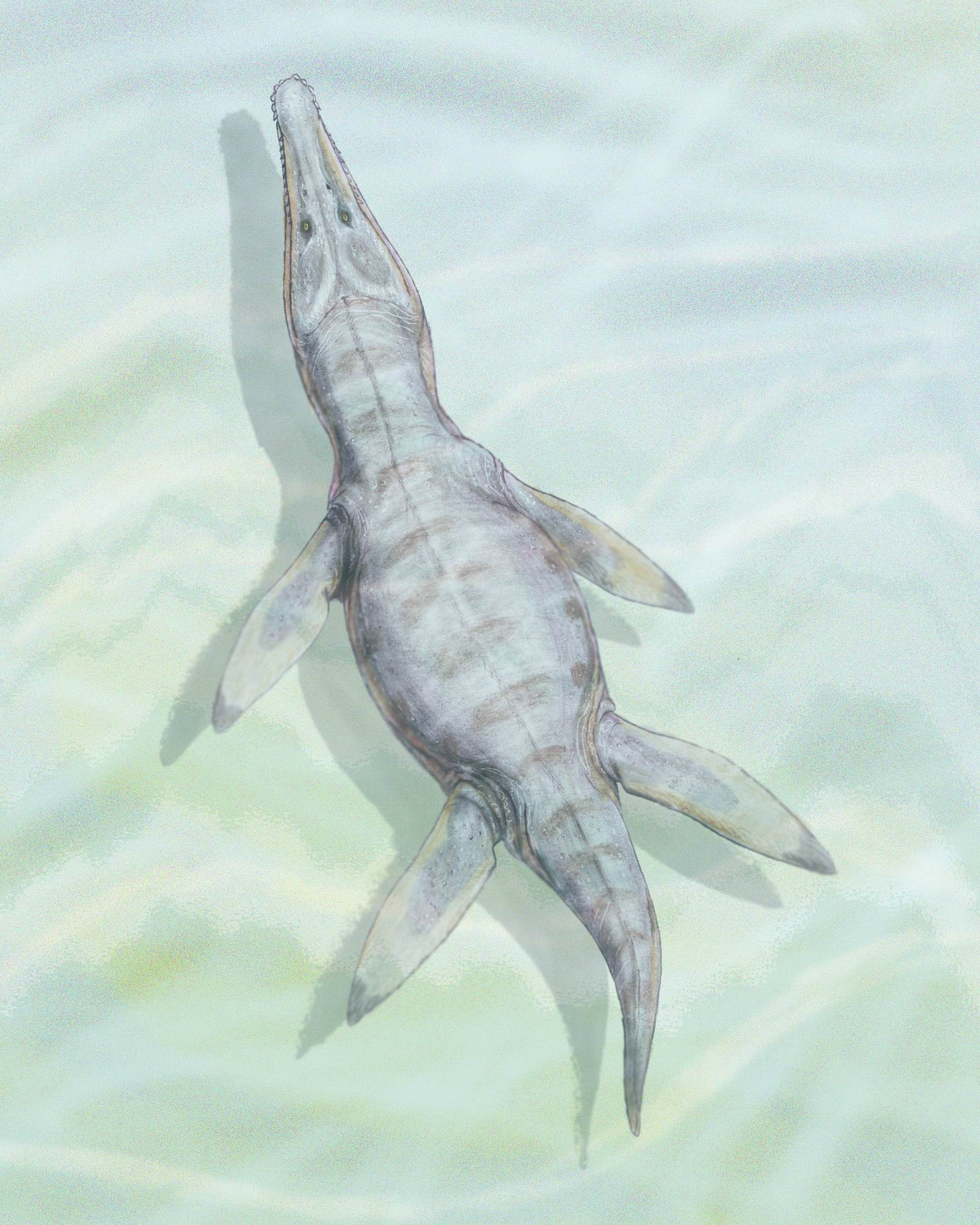
Kronosaurus boyacensis; El Fósil, Villa de Leyva

The Altiplano Cundiboyacense is formed as part of the uplift of the Eastern Ranges of the Colombian Andes since Neogene times. Hydrothermal activity in fractures of the forming Andean chain left its trace in the form of the many emeralds found in the western and eastern parts of the Altiplano. From the Early Cretaceous until the Eocene, the region of the present-day Altiplano was dominated by a marine environment, as part of the long inland sea of northern South America. In these warm tropical seas a fauna of ichthyosaurs and pliosaurs developed, with important finds (Kronosaurus boyacensis (El Fósil), Muiscasaurus, with four nostrils) in the Paja Formation of Villa de Leyva. During the Late Eocene-Early Oligocene (35-30 Mya) epochs, South America became detached from its longest connected former member of Pangea; Antarctica. The isolation of the South American paleocontinent led to a large biodiversity of New World species.

The dominating group of top predators and scavengers for decades of millions of years on the continent were the terror birds. Fossils of terror birds have been found throughout South America, with a major collection from current Argentina, where the biggest terror bird, Kelenken, roamed the paleopampas in the early Miocene. The forming Andes created a hilly landscape in the regions bordering the former sea inlet from the proto-Caribbean. Other land animals in the Tertiary were the xenungulate Etayoa bacatensis, evidence for which has been found in 1987 in the Bogotá Formation of the southern Altiplano.

The biodiversity and former tranquility of the isolated ecosystem changed during the Pliocene, when the Panama Block emerged from the seas and formed a transferable connection with formerly isolated North America. This Great American Biotic Interchange led to a drastic rearrangement of South American fauna. Migrating species from North America replaced many formerly successful South American animals, among which the terror birds.

The Late Pleistocene of the Altiplano Cundiboyacense has been analysed in detail through various methods based on fossils found on the Altiplano. Pleistocene megafauna inhabited the glacial highlands of the eastern Andean chain. The climate in the glacials and stadials led to the formation of various prehistoric lakes in the valleys of the Altiplano. The Ubaté-Chiquinquirá Valley in the northwest of the Altiplano was covered with a lake, of which the current Lake Fúquene is a retreating remainder. To the extreme northeast, in Soatá, another Pleistocene lake was present. The largest paleolake in the latest Pleistocene was Lake Humboldt or Lake Bogotá covering the Bogotá savanna. The lake, some 4,000 square kilometres (1,500 sq mi) in size, at that time would have been seventy times larger than the biggest lake of Colombia; present-day Lake Tota. Lake Tota is the remnant of a Pleistocene glacial lake higher up the Altiplano to the east. Lake Humboldt is thought to have existed until around 30,000 years ago with as modern remaining water bodies Lake Herrera, wetlands of Bogotá and the Bogotá River. Lake Humboldt had an irregular shoreline with an island in the centre; the present-day Suba Hills.

The Altiplano Cundiboyacense is regarded one of eleven archaeological regions of Colombia. The earliest evidence of human occupation in the region has been found in Pubenza, to the west of the Altiplano, dating to 16,000 years BP. On the Altiplano, the oldest findings are dated at 12,400 ± 160 years in El Abra. Slightly younger occurrences of settlement by hunter-gatherers have been discovered at Tibitó, with an estimated age of 11,740 +/- 110 years BP and Tequendama dated at 10,920 ± 260 years BP. In the earliest ages of human population prehistoric animals as the Cuvieronius, Haplomastodon and Equus amerhippus were living on the Altiplano.

=== Andean preceramic ===
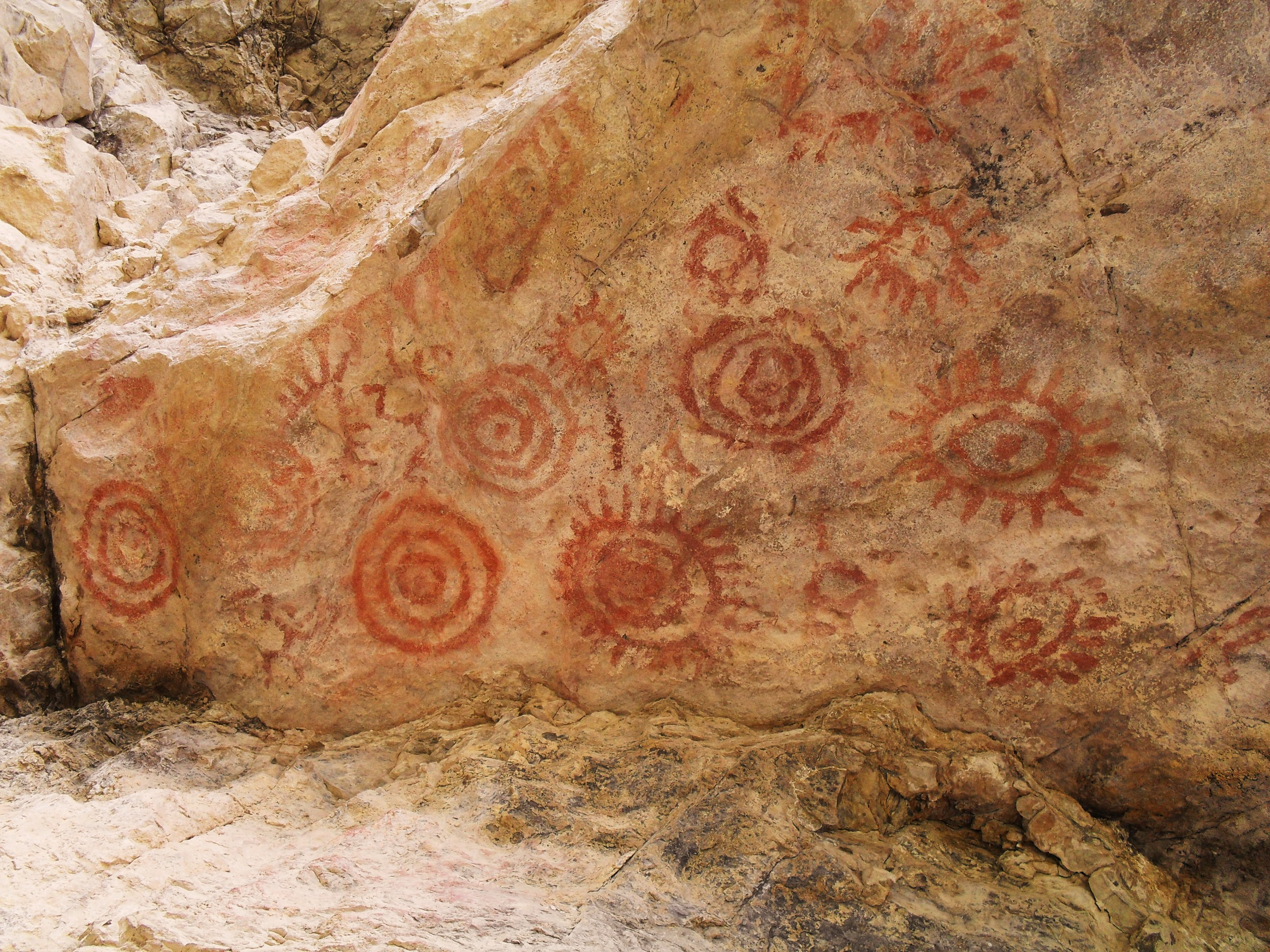
Pictographs discovered in a rock shelter outside Sáchica, Boyaça

Later dated excavations have revealed a transition from a hunter-gatherer society living in rock shelters to open area settlements with Checua and Aguazuque as examples. Various burial sites at Checua have been dated between 8200 and 7800 years BP. During the earliest phases, the first humans lived together with Pleistocene now extinct mastodons, as the fossil remains of Haplomastodon waringi, Neochoerus and Odocoileus in Soatá indicate.

The main part of the diet of the people was formed by white-tailed deer (Odocoileus virginianus). Other mammals included little red brocket (Mazama rufina), guinea pigs (Cavia porcellus), nine-banded armadillo (Dasypus novemcinctus), white-lipped peccary (Tayassu pecari), crab-eating fox (Dusicyon thous), spectacled bear (Tremarctos ornatus), ocelot (Felis pardalis), puma (Felis concolor), lowland paca (Agouti paca), Agouti taczamawskii, Dasyprocta, ring-tailed coati (Nasua nasua), western mountain coati (Nasuella olivacea), common opossum (Didelphis marsupialis) and collared anteater (Tamandua tetradactyla).

==== Rock art ====
Various archaeological sites with petroglyphs or pictographs have been discovered on the Altiplano Cundiboyacense, among others in Bojacá, Bogotá, Chía, Usme, Cogua, Cota, Facatativá, Nemocón, Madrid, Mosquera, Sáchica, Sibaté, Soacha, Subachoque, Suesca, Sutatausa, Tenjo, Tocancipá, Zipacón, Zipaquirá.

=== Ceramic pre-Columbian ===
The ages between 3000 and 1000 years before present corresponds to the Herrera Period, and the era between 1000 BP and 1537, the year of the Spanish conquest, to the Muisca Confederation.

The Muisca were the inhabitants of the central Andean highlands of Colombia before the arrival of the Spanish conquistadors. They were organised in a loose confederation of different rulers; the zipa of Bacatá, with his headquarters in Funza, the zaque of Hunza, the iraca of the sacred City of the Sun Sugamuxi, the Tundama of Tundama, and several independent caciques. The leaders of the Confederation at the time of conquest were zipa Tisquesusa, zaque Quemuenchatocha, iraca Sugamuxi and Tundama in the northernmost portion of their territories. The Muisca were organised in small communities of circular enclosures (ca in their language Muysccubbun; literally "language of the people"), with a central square where the bohío of the cacique was located. They were called "Salt People" because of their extraction of salt in various locations throughout their territories, mainly in Zipaquirá, Nemocón and Tausa. For the main part self-sufficient in their well-organised economy, the Muisca traded with the European conquistadors valuable products as gold, tumbaga (a copper-silver-gold alloy) and emeralds with their neighbouring indigenous groups. In the Tenza Valley, to the east of the Altiplano Cundiboyacense where the majority of the Muisca lived, they extracted emeralds in Chivor and Somondoco.

The economy of the Muisca was rooted in their agriculture with main products maize, yuca, potatoes and various other cultivations elaborated on elevated fields (in their language called tá). Agriculture had started around 3000 BCE on the Altiplano. The agriculture of the Muisca was performed on small-scale cropfields, part of more extensive lands, and in a rather egalitarian manner; the higher social classes did not have access to more agricultural products than the lower class Muisca people. Their main difference was in the construction of their houses and access to meat.

The predominant agricultural product of the Muisca was maize and they had numerous words in their language, Muysccubun for the plant, kernels and processing of it. Evidence for maize cultivation predates the Muisca; already in the Herrera Period maize cultivation has been identified based on pollen analysis. The cacicazgos were self-sufficient in their agricultural products and surpluses of maize (abitago) were traded for more tropical climate fruits such as pineapples, avocados and Ipomea batatas. The Muisca used terraces for their agriculture on the often flooded highlands and a system of irrigation and drainage was developed. They cultivated their crops in rows of mounds.

=== Spanish conquest ===
A delegation of more than 900 men left the tropical city of Santa Marta in April 1536 and went on a harsh expedition through the heartlands of Colombia in search of El Dorado and the civilisation that produced all that precious gold. The leader of the first and main expedition under Spanish flag was Gonzalo Jiménez de Quesada, with his brother Hernán second in command. Several other soldiers were participating in the journey, who would later become encomenderos and take part in the conquest of other parts of Colombia. Other contemporaneous expeditions into the unknown interior of the Andes, all searching for the mythical land of gold, were starting from later Venezuela, led by Bavarian and other German conquistadors and from the south, starting in the previously founded Kingdom of Quito in what is now Ecuador.

The conquest of the Muisca on the Altiplano started in March 1537, when the greatly reduced troops of De Quesada entered Muisca territories in Chipatá, the first settlement they founded on March 8. The expedition went further inland and up the slopes of the Altiplano Cundiboyacense into later Boyacá and Cundinamarca. The towns of Moniquirá (Boyacá) and Guachetá and Lenguazaque (Cundinamarca) were founded before the conquistadors arrived at the northern edge of the Bogotá savanna in Suesca. continued to Lenguazaque that was founded the next day, En route towards the domain of zipa Tisquesusa, the Spanish founded Cajicá and Chía. In April 1537 they arrived at Funza, where Tisquesusa was beaten by the Spanish. This formed the onset for further expeditions, starting a month later towards the eastern Tenza Valley and the northern territories of zaque Quemuenchatocha. On August 20, 1537, the zaque was submitted in his bohío in Hunza. The Spanish continued their journey northeastward into the Iraca Valley, where the iraca Sugamuxi fell to the Spanish troops and the Sun Temple was accidentally burned by two soldiers of the army of De Quesada in early September.

Meanwhile, other soldiers from the conquest expedition went south and conquered Pasca and other settlements. The Spanish leader returned with his men to the Bogotá savanna and planned new conquest expeditions executed in the second half of 1537 and first months of 1538. On August 6, 1538, Gonzalo Jiménez de Quesada founded Bogotá as the capital of the New Kingdom of Granada, named after his home region of Granada, Spain. That same month, on August 20, the zipa who succeeded his brother Tisquesusa upon his death; Sagipa, allied with the Spanish to fight the Panche, eternal enemies of the Muisca in the southwest. In the Battle of Tocarema, the allied forces claimed victory over the bellicose western neighbours. In late 1538, other conquest undertakings resulted in more founded settlements in the heart of the Andes. Two other expeditions that were taking place at the same time; of De Belalcázar from the south and Federmann from the east, reached the newly founded capital and the three leaders embarked in May 1539 on a ship on the Magdalena River that took them to Cartagena and from there back to Spain. Gonzalo Jiménez de Quesada had installed his younger brother Hernán as new governor of Bogotá and the latter organised new conquest campaigns in search of El Dorado during the second half of 1539 and 1540. His captain Gonzalo Suárez Rendón founded Tunja on August 6, 1539, and captain Baltasar Maldonado, who had served under De Belalcázar, defeated the cacique of Tundama at the end of 1539. The last zaque Aquiminzaque was decapitated in early 1540, establishing the new rule over the former Muisca Confederation.

=== Modern day ===
Present-day, due to the large population and agriculture of the Altiplano, the original vegetation is at risk.

=== Timeline of inhabitation ===
Timeline of inhabitation of the Altiplano Cundiboyacense, Colombia
Altiplano Muisca Confederation

== Cities ==
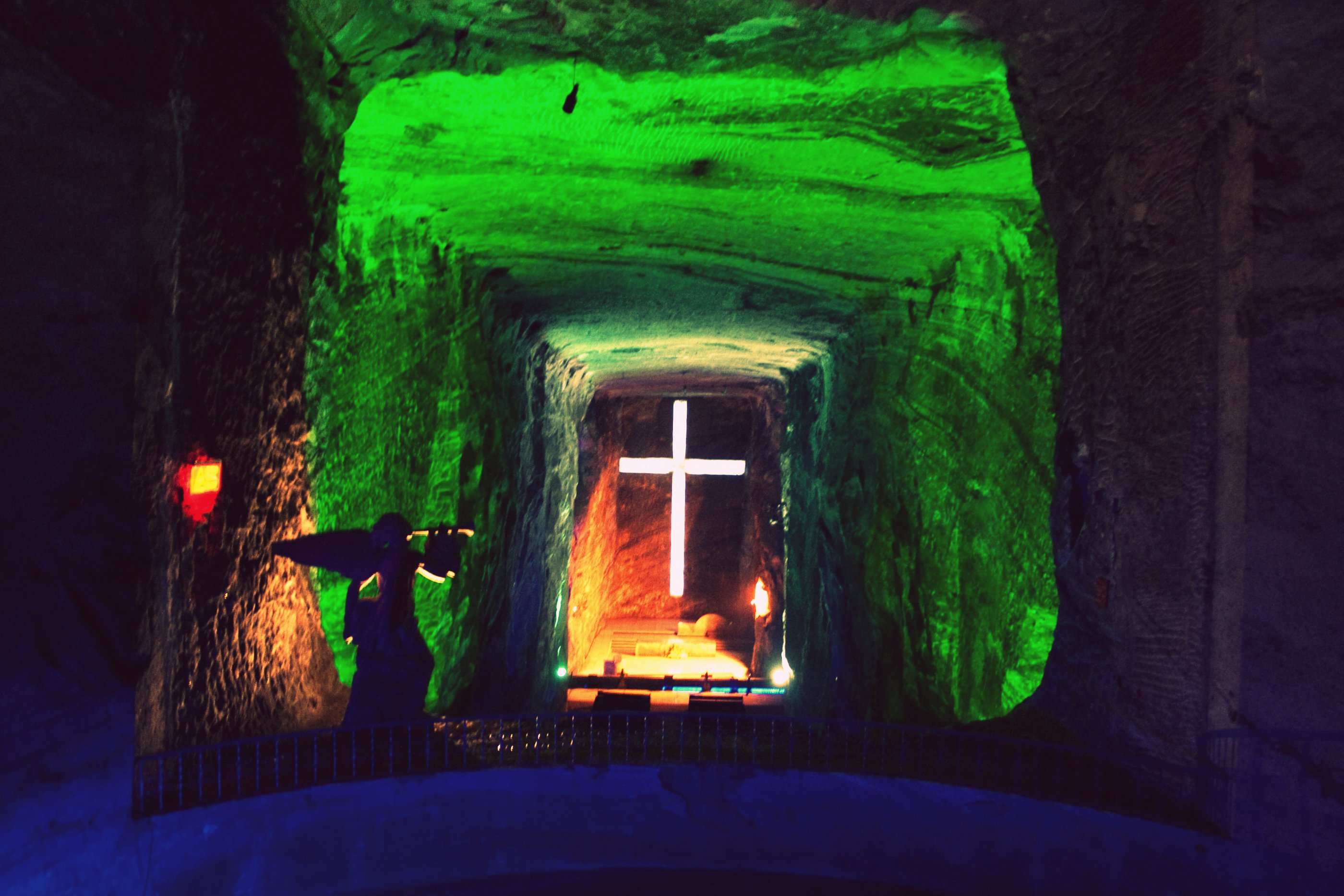
Salt Cathedral of Zipaquirá is located in the centre of the Altiplano

Most important city of the Altiplano Cundiboyacense is the Colombian capital Bogotá. Other cities are, from northeast to southwest:

- Sogamoso
- Duitama
- Chiquinquirá
- Villa de Leyva
- Tunja
- Ubaté
- Suesca
- Tocancipá
- Zipaquirá
- Cajicá
- Chía
- Facatativá
- Soacha
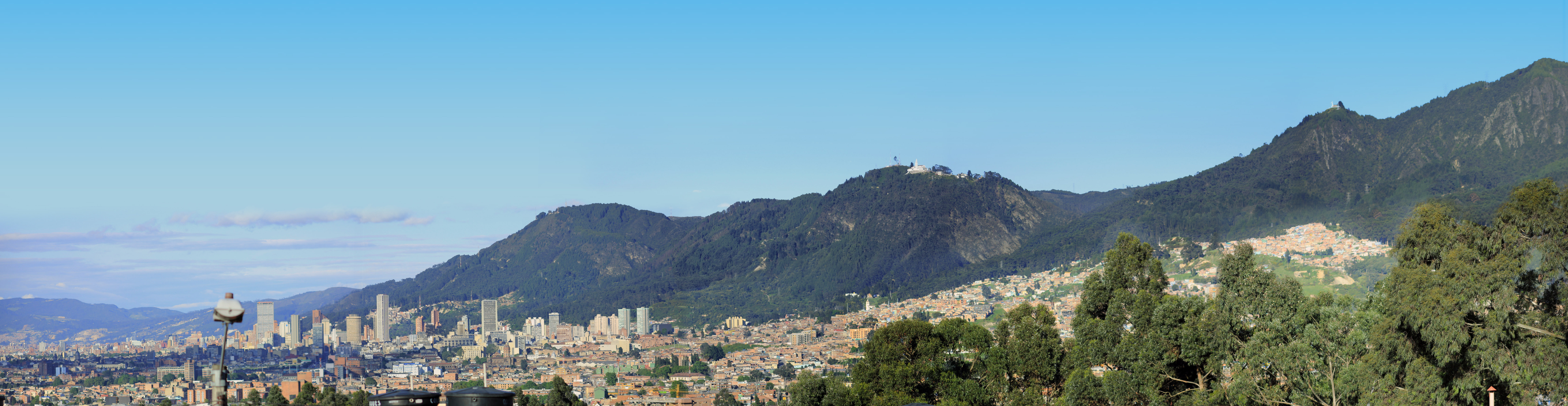
Panoramic view from the south of the Bogotá savanna

== Hydrology ==
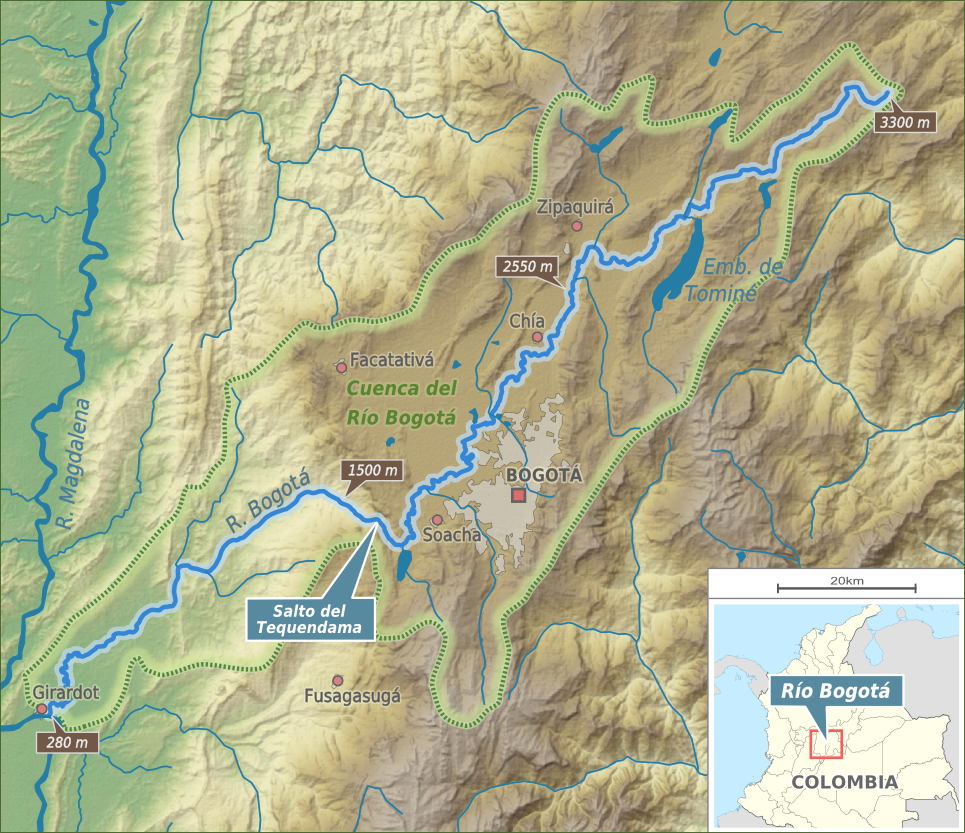
Map of the Bogotá River basin

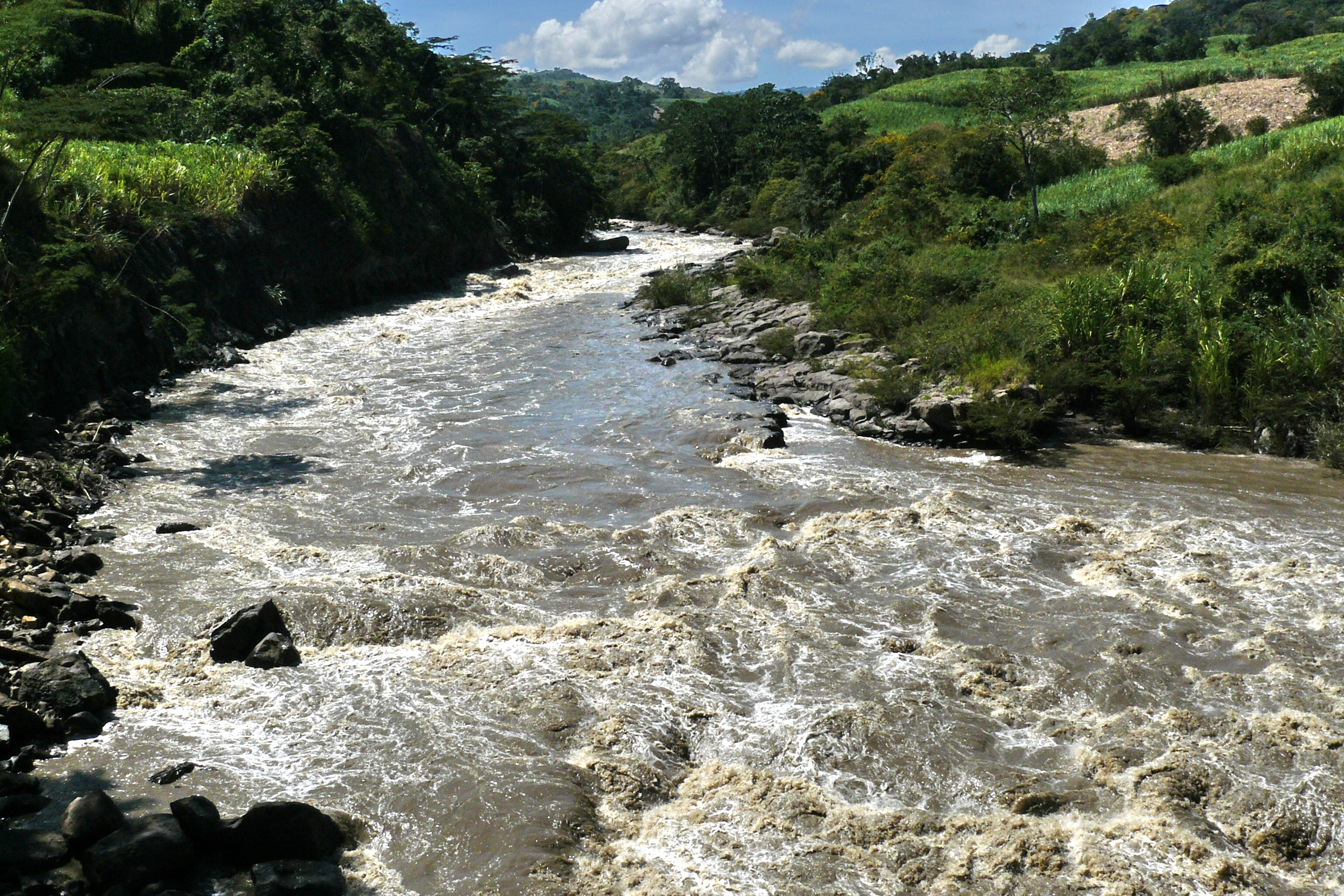
The Suárez River flows in the northern part of the Altiplano.

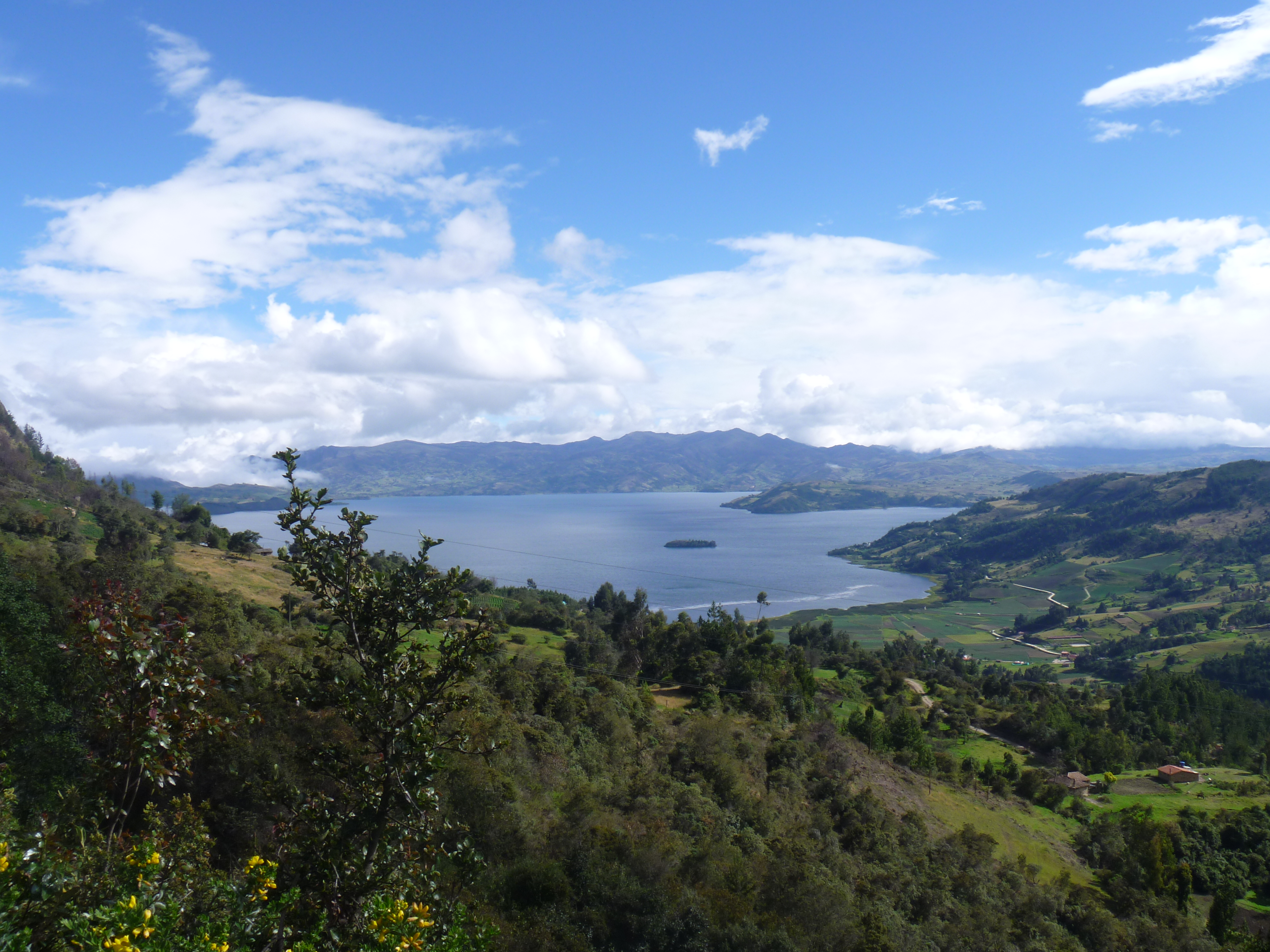
Lake Tota, Colombia's largest lake is situated in the northeast of the Altiplano.

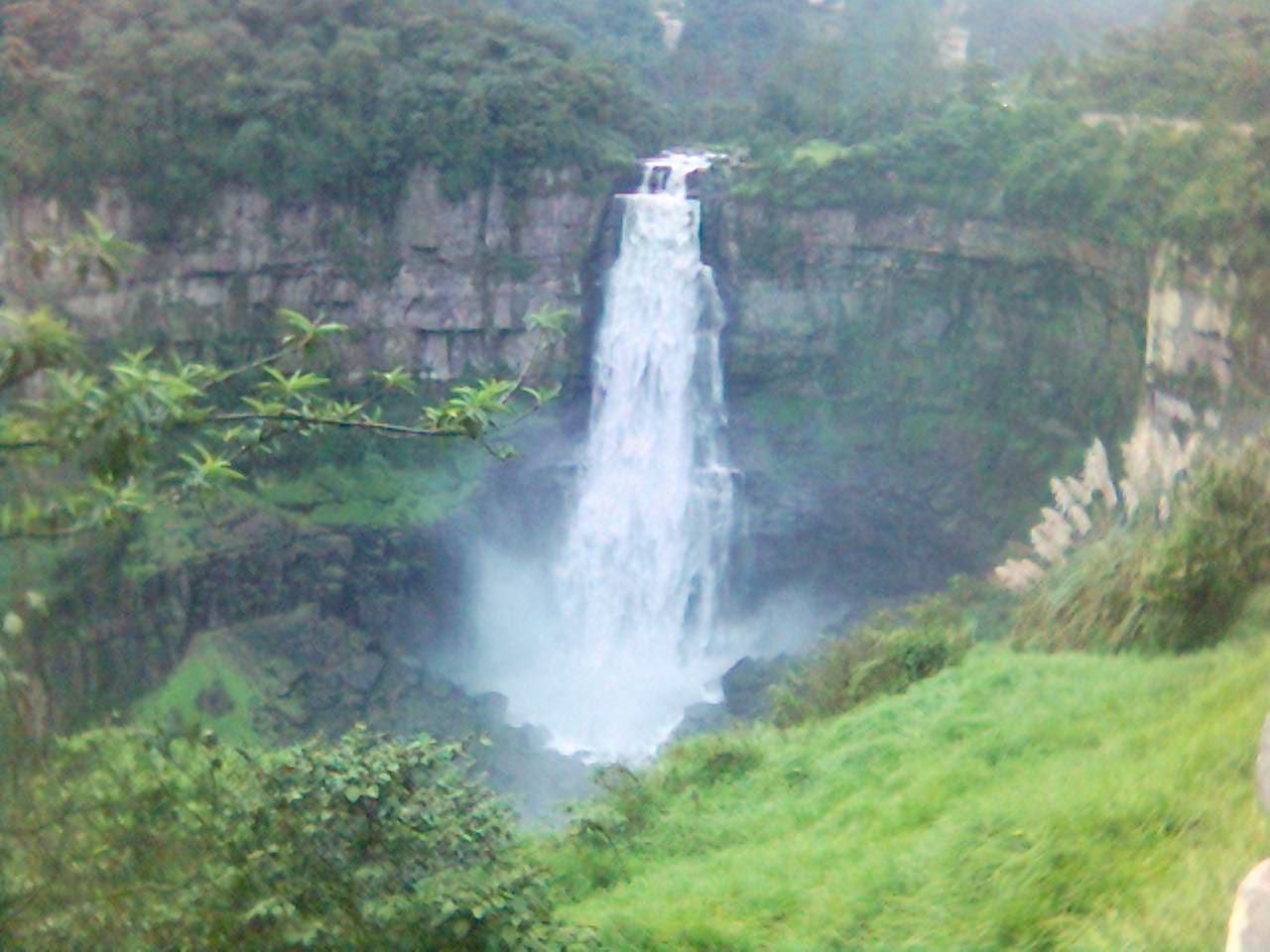
The Tequendama Falls are the most impressive waterfalls of the Altiplano Cundiboyacense, and are located in the southwest.

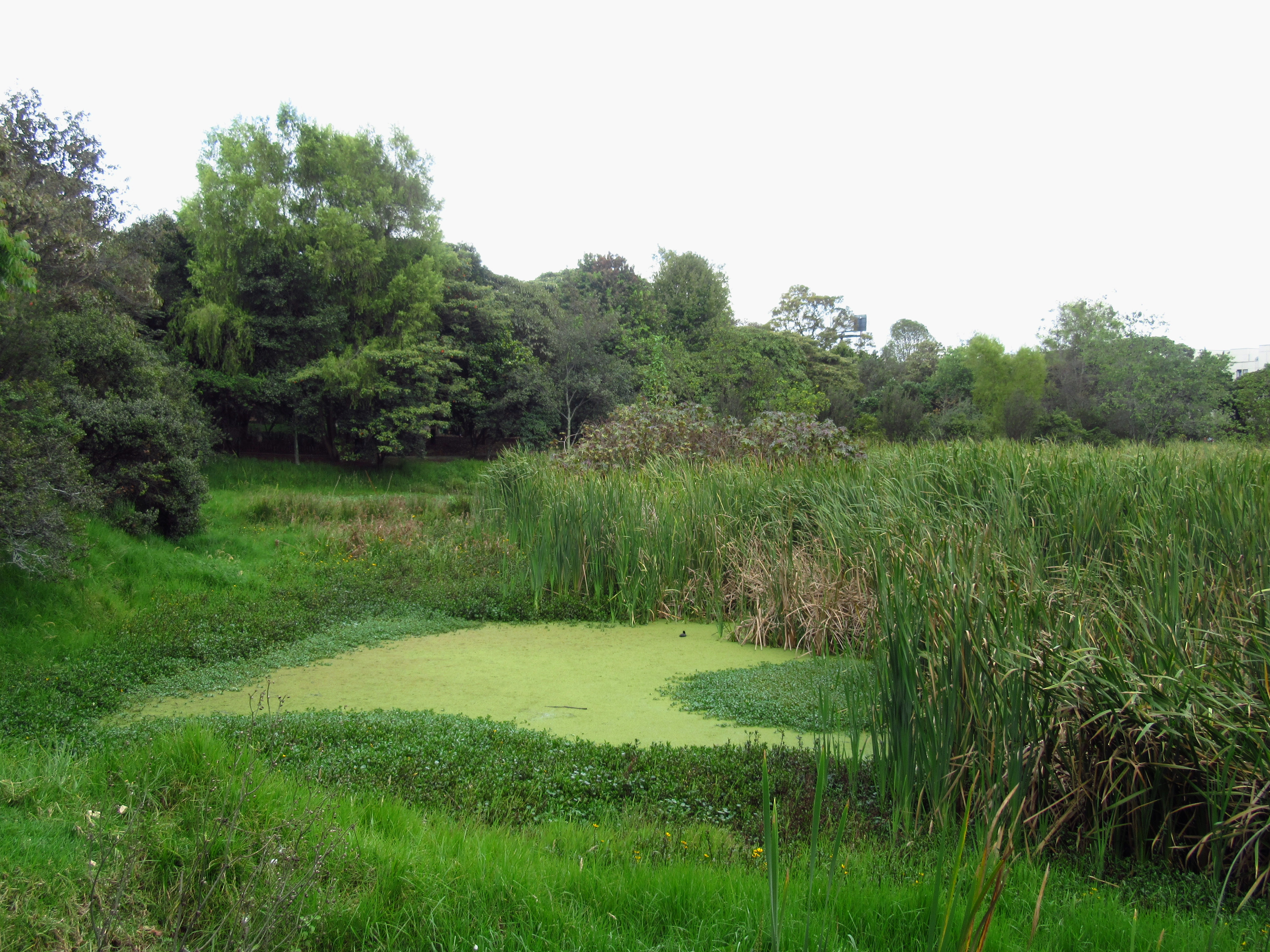
Santa María del Lago wetland

The Altiplano Cundiboyacense hosts a number of rivers and lakes.

=== Rivers ===
Magdalena Basin

- Bogotá River

left

  - Teusacá River
  - Juan Amarillo River
  - Fucha River
  - Tunjuelo River
  - Soacha River

right

  - Neusa River
  - Río Frío
  - Bojacá River
  - Subachoque River
- Sogamoso River
  - Chicamocha River
  - Suárez River
    - Ubaté River

Orinoco Basin, via Meta River

- Cravo Sur River
- Cusiana River
- Guavio River
- Lengupá River
- Upía River

=== Lakes ===
==== Natural ====
- Lake Tota, largest lake of Colombia
- Lake Fúquene
- Lake Guatavita
- Lake Herrera
- Lake Iguaque
- Siecha Lakes
- Lake Suesca

==== Artificial ====
- La Copa Reservoir
- El Muña Reservoir
- Neusa Reservoir
- San Rafael Reservoir
- Sisga Reservoir
- Lake Sochagota
- Tominé Reservoir
- Lake Herrera (since 1973)

=== Waterfalls ===
- Tequendama Falls

=== Wetlands ===
- Wetlands of Bogotá
  - El Burro
  - Capellanía
  - La Conejera
  - Córdoba
  - La Florida
  - Guaymaral y Torca
  - La Isla
  - Jaboque
  - Maiporé
  - Meandro del Say
  - El Salitre
  - Santa María del Lago
  - Techo
  - Tibabuyes
  - Tibanica
  - La Vaca
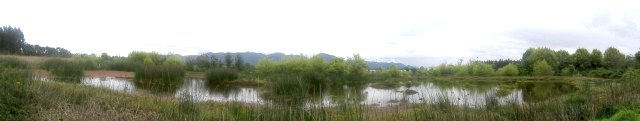
La Conejera wetland

== Altiplanos in Latin America ==
Latin America	Valley of Mexico	Altiplano Cundiboyacense	Altiplano Boliviano
Paleolake	Lake Texcoco	Lake Humboldt	Lake Tauca
Human occupation (yr BP)	11,100 – Tocuila	12,560 – El Abra	3530 – Tiwanaku
Pre-Columbian civilisation	Aztec	Muisca	Inca
Today	Mexico City	(Colombia) Bogotá, Tunja	(Peru) Lake Titicaca (Bolivia) Salar de Uyuni
Elevation	2,236 m (7,336 ft)	2,780 m (9,120 ft)	3,800 m (12,500 ft)
Area	9,738 km^{2} (3,760 sq mi)	25,000 km^{2} (9,700 sq mi)	175,773 km^{2} (67,866 sq mi)
References			

== See also ==
- Altiplano Nariñense
- Andes, Bogotá savanna
- Eastern Hills, Bogotá
- Muisca, Muisca Confederation, Ocetá Páramo
- Tenza Valley, Chicamocha Canyon
