= Ubaté (disambiguation) =

Ubaté may refer to:

- Ubaté, municipality of Cundinamarca, Colombia
- Ubaté Province, province of which Ubaté is the capital
- Ubaté River, river flowing in this area
- Chiquinquirá-Ubaté Valley, valley of Ubaté on the Altiplano Cundiboyacense
