= Lake Fúquene =

Lake in Cundinamarca Department, Colombia

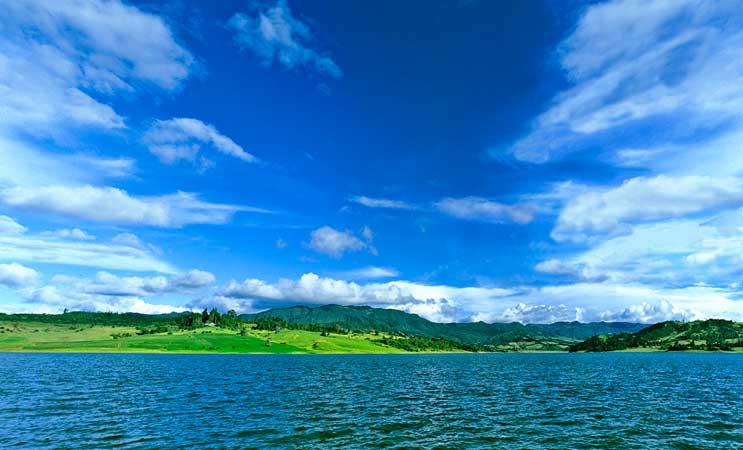
- View of Lake Fúquene

- Location within Colombia

- Lake Fúquene is shown in the south of Boyacá, bordering Cundinamarca
- Location: Fúquene, Boyacá & Cundinamarca
- Coordinates: 5°28′00″N 73°45′00″W
- Type: Intermontane
- Primary outflows: Suárez River
- Basin countries: Colombia
- Max. length: 9.1 kilometres (5.7 mi) (1957)
- Max. width: 6.2 kilometres (3.9 mi) (1957)
- Surface area: 30 square kilometres (320,000,000 sq ft)
- Average depth: 2.5 metres (8.2 ft)
- Max. depth: 4 metres (13 ft) (1957)
- Water volume: 82.5 cubic megametres (2.91×10^{21} cu ft)
- Surface elevation: 2,540 metres (8,330 ft)
- Islands: Formerly Isla grande or Chiguy/Chuiguí

Lake Fúquene is a heart-shaped lake located in the Ubaté-Chiquinquirá Valley, part of the Altiplano Cundiboyacense, in the north of Cundinamarca, Colombia, at the border with Boyacá. The Andean lake, at an average altitude of 2,540 metres (8,330 ft), was considered sacred in the religion of the Muisca who inhabited the area before the Spanish conquest of the Muisca in the 1530s.

Due to drainage of the waters for agriculture and dairy farming, the lake levels have dropped drastically in recent years and many flora and fauna species have disappeared.

== Etymology ==
In the Chibcha language of the Muisca, Fúquene means "Place of swamps covered with fog", "Bed of the fox" or "Holy People", referring to the religious rituals of the Muisca. Muisca means "people" in Chibcha.

== History ==
Lake Fúquene, the lake in the Ubaté-Chiquinquirá Valley, one of the four major valleys of the Altiplano Cundiboyacense, was an important ritual lake in the culture of the Muisca. It formed the connection between the territories of the zipa in the south and zaque in the north and merchants between the two parts of the Muisca Confederation would pass the lake.

When conquistador Gonzalo Jiménez de Quesada and his troops arrived at the lake in 1537, the water level was 10 metres (33 ft) to 15 metres (49 ft) higher.

Since 1934 about 70% of the lake surface has shrunk, from 100 square kilometres (1.1×10^{9} sq ft) to 30 square kilometres (320,000,000 sq ft). In this time, the lake level has dropped by 1 metre (3.3 ft).

== Flora, fauna and environmental issues ==
Around 47 bird species visit in Lake Fúquene, among them Agelaius icterocephalus bogotensis and Fulica americana. In 1940, more than 80 fauna species were foraging around the lake, a number that had reduced to 58 in 2014.

In and around the lake 248 plant species have been identified. Some of the flora species are Scirpus californicus, Typha, Ixobrichus exilis bogotensis, and Alnus jorullensis. In recent years, 40% of the biodiversity has disappeared in the past 60 years.

In 2014, around 207,000 inhabitants of the area lived around the lake. Fifty dairy farming industries exist around it, with the most important in Ubaté, Chiquinquirá and Simijaca.

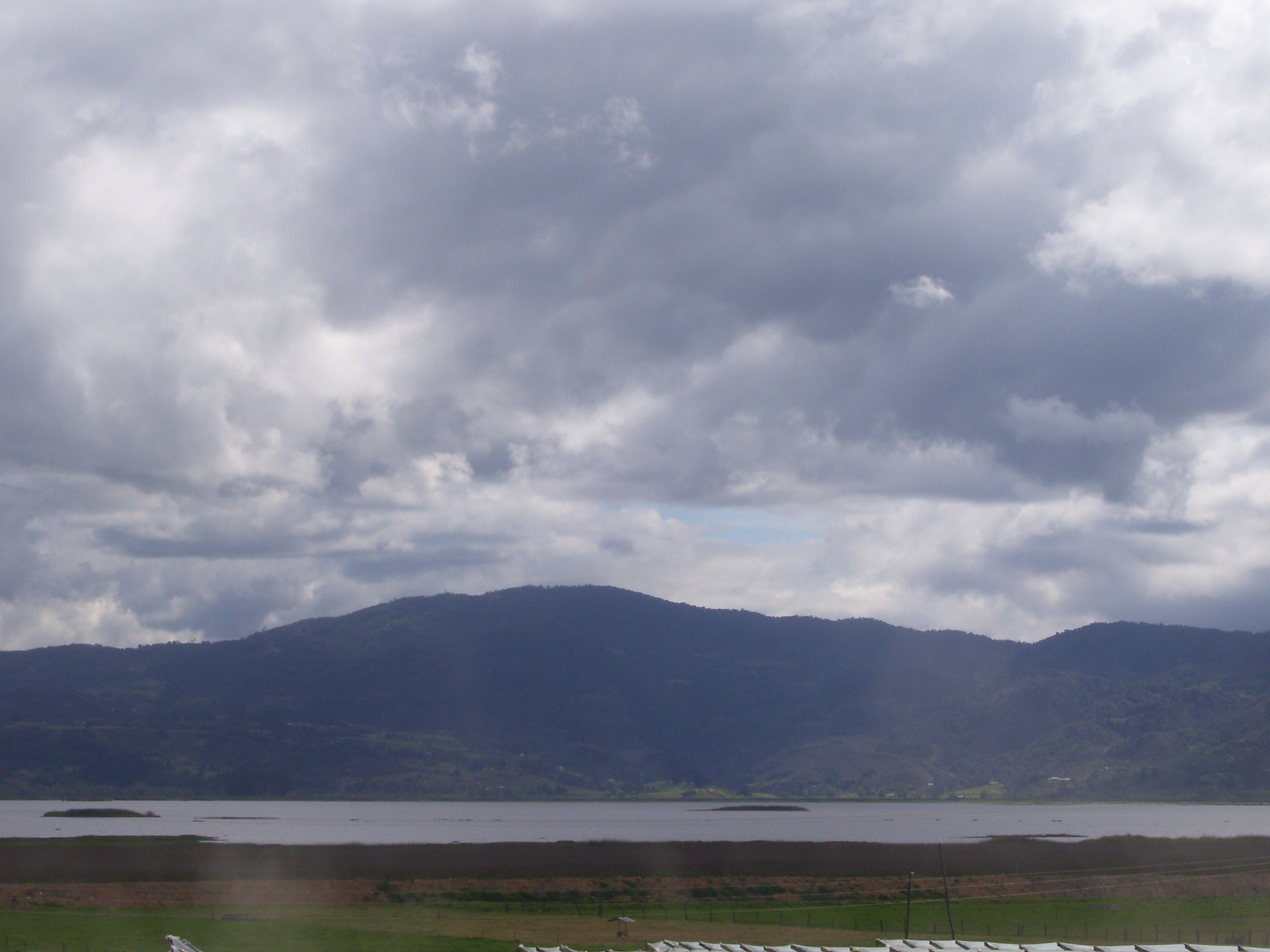
View of Lake Fúquene

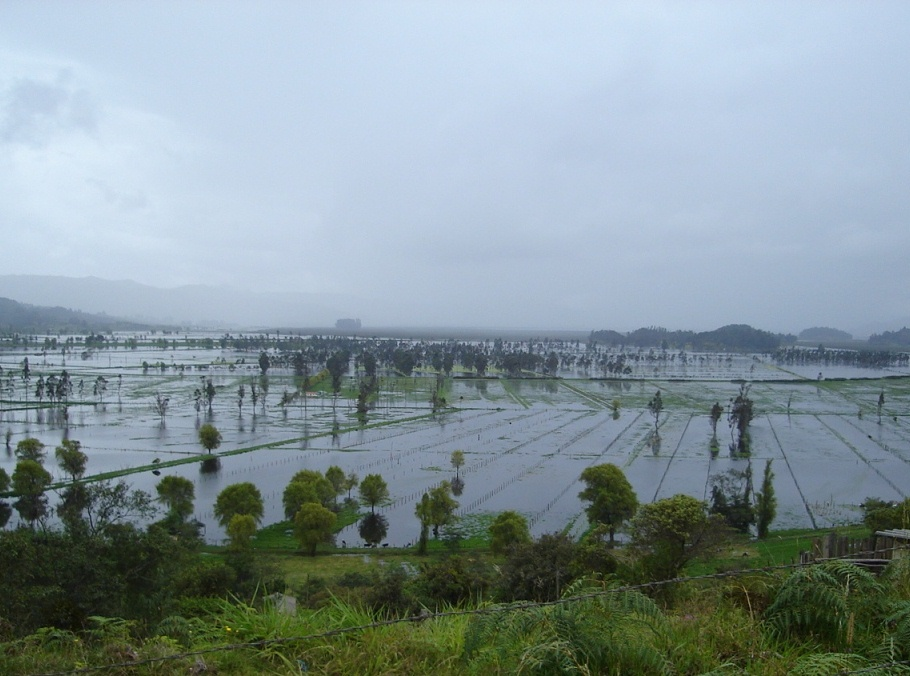
Lake Fúquene overflowing

== See also ==
- Muisca religion
- Lake Guatavita, Iguaque, Suesca, Tota, Siecha Lakes
