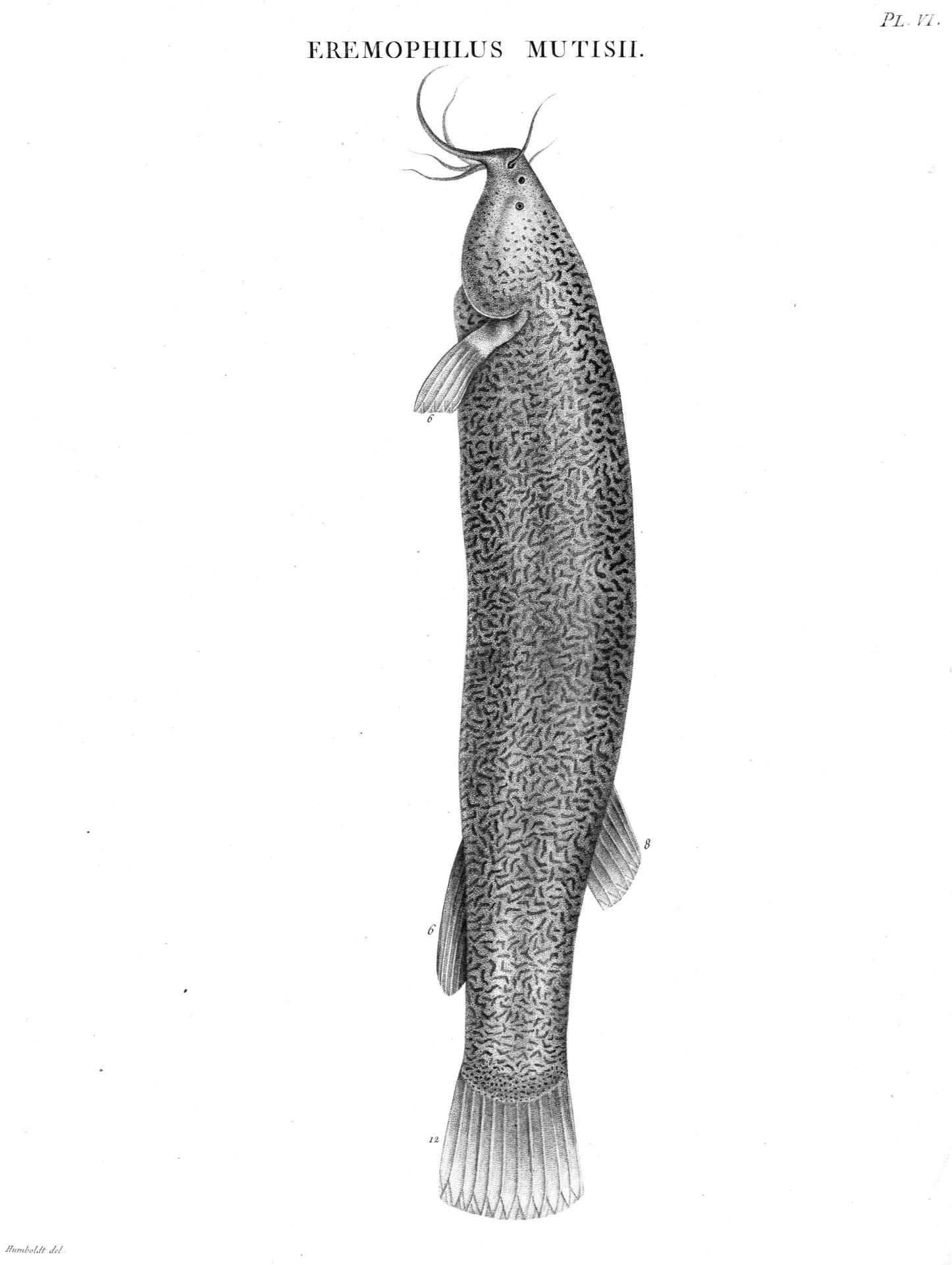
- Eremophilus mutisii, original illustration by Humboldt

Conservation status
- Least Concern (IUCN 3.1)

Scientific classification
- Kingdom: Animalia
- Phylum: Chordata
- Class: Actinopterygii
- Order: Siluriformes
- Family: Trichomycteridae
- Subfamily: Trichomycterinae
- Genus: Eremophilus; Humboldt, 1805
- Species: E. mutisii

Binomial name
- Eremophilus mutisii Humboldt, 1805

Synonyms
- Of Eremophilus: Thrichomycterus Humboldt, 1805; Trachypoma Giebel, 1871; Of E. mutisii: Trachypoma marmoratum Giebel, 1871; Trichomycterus venulosus Steindachner, 1915

= Eremophilus =

Genus of fishes

Eremophilus is a monospecific genus of freshwater ray-finned fish belonging to the family Trichomycteridae, the pencil and parasitic catfishes, the only species in the genus is Eremophilus mutisii. This fish grows to about 30 centimetres (12 in) and originates from the Bogotá River basin, which is a tributary of the Magdalena River. It has probably been introduced to Ubaté, Chiquinquirá, and Tundama valleys, Colombia.

E. mutisii uses the vascularized central portion of its stomach for aerial respiration. Air ventilation takes place during a rapid dash to the surface with the expiration of old air preceding inspiration. Air-breathing occurs in hypoxic and normoxic water, but is not obligatory. The evolution of a reduced swimbladder is associated with a benthic mode of life in E. mutisii.

This fish species is an excellent food fish. It is the only species of food fish which has been able to survive competition from introduced trout and carp species into the region.
