= Altiplano Nariñense =

The Altiplano Nariñense or Nariño plateau is an area of flat lands located on the eastern mountain range of the Colombian Andes cordillera, in the departments of Nariño and Putumayo, in southern Colombia. The region comprises three fairly distinguishable flat areas such as the Túquerres and Ipiales plateau, the Atriz valley and the Sibundoy valley. It is a region of great demographic density where there are numerous urban centers, among which the cities of San Juan de Pasto, Ipiales and Túquerres stand out.

The average altitude is 2,700 meters above sea level. It has a mountain climate, which varies with altitude, with temperatures ranging between 10 and 23 degrees Celsius.

== See also ==
- Altiplano Cundiboyacense - farther north
- The Altiplano - farther south, in Peru and Bolivia
- Andes, Bogotá savanna
- Tenza Valley, Chicamocha Canyon
