= Lake Suesca =

Lake in Colombia

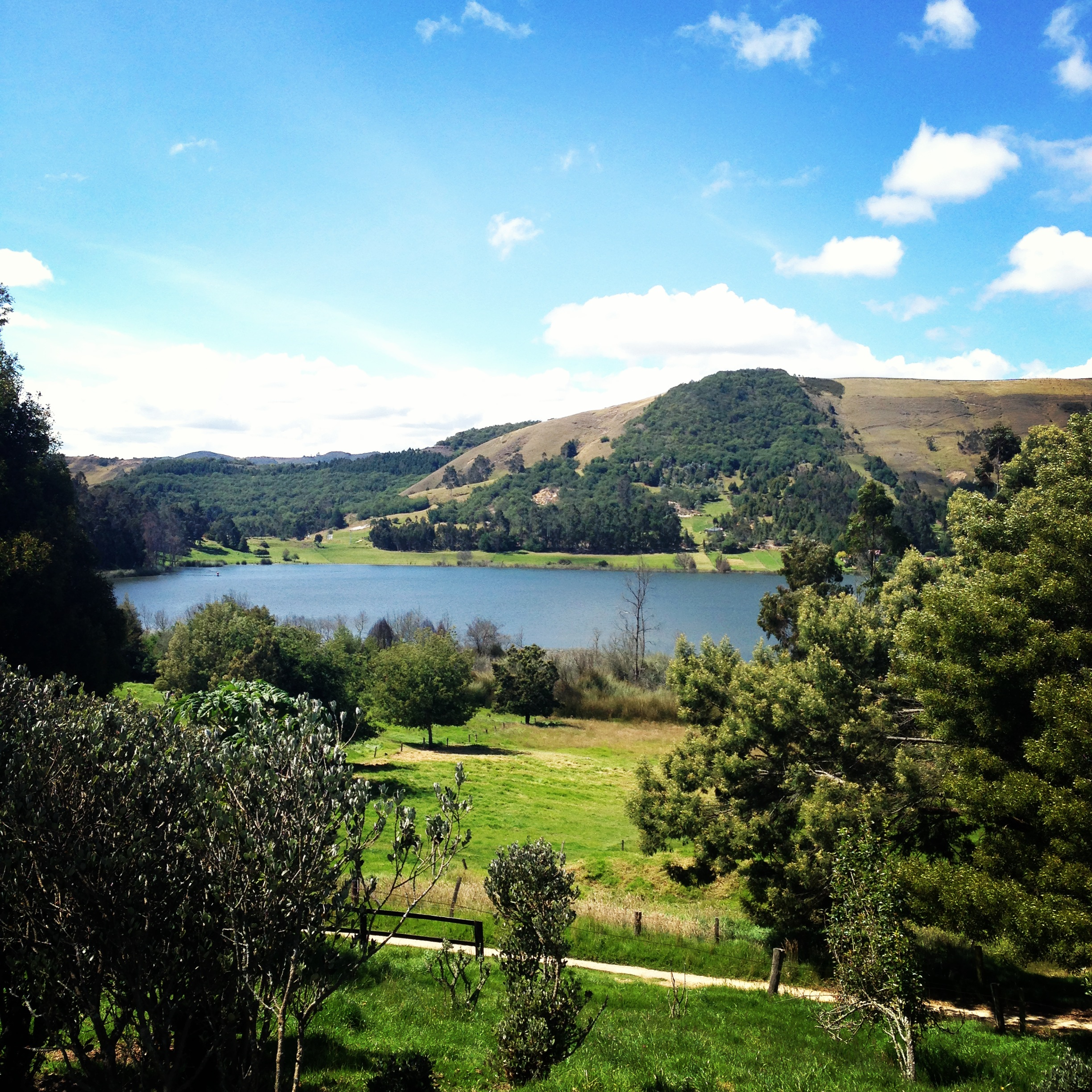
- View of the lake from the east

- Location within Colombia
- Location: Suesca & Cucunubá, Cundinamarca
- Coordinates: 5°11′N 73°47′W
- Type: Intermontane
- Basin countries: Colombia
- Max. length: 6 kilometres (3.7 mi)
- Max. width: 2 kilometres (1.2 mi)
- Average depth: 8 metres (26 ft)
- Surface elevation: 2,800 m (9,200 ft)

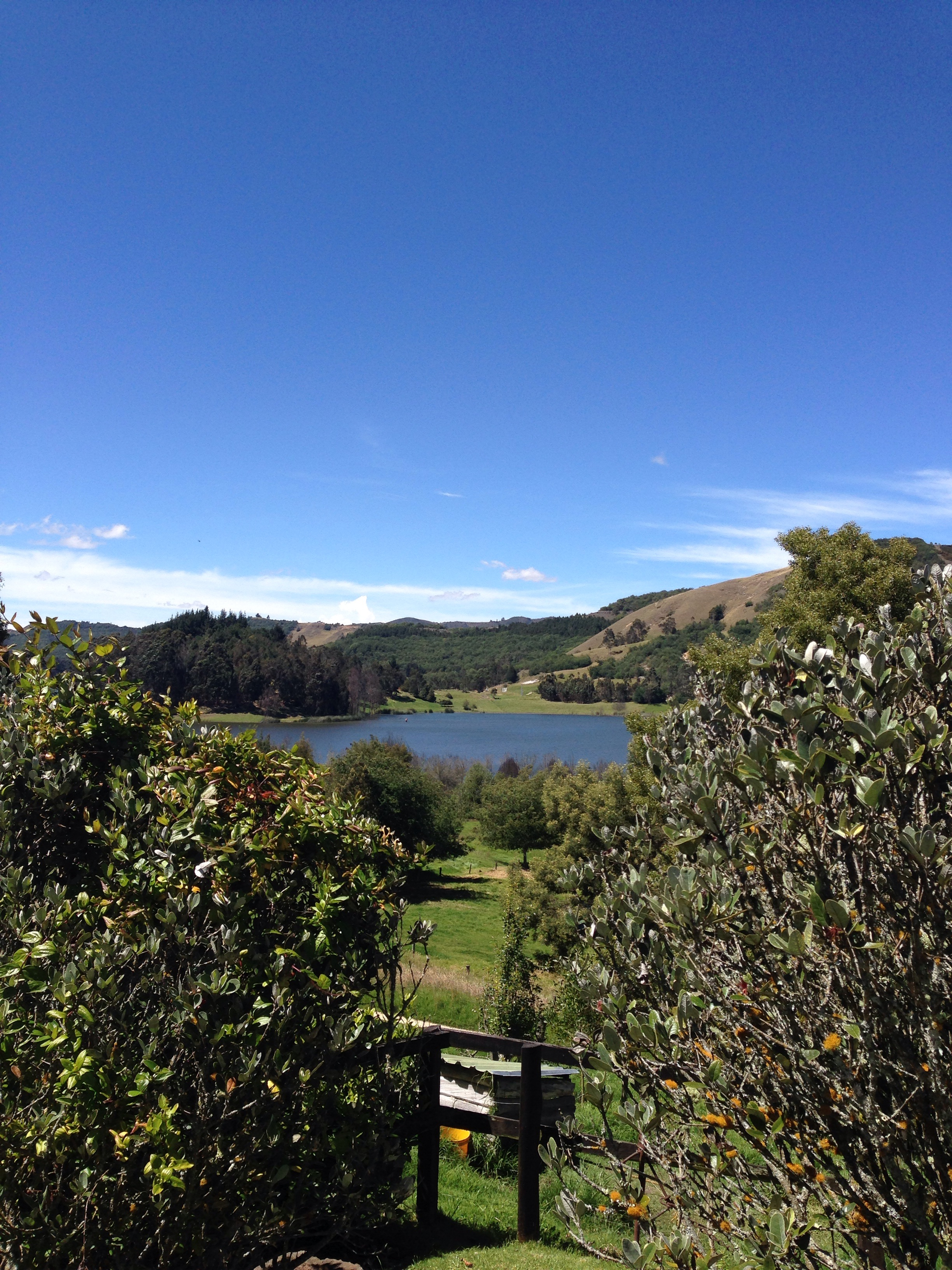
View of the lake from the east

Lake Suesca is a natural water body situated on the Altiplano Cundiboyacense, belonging to the municipalities of Suesca and Cucunubá in the department of Cundinamarca, Colombia. The basin has a semi-elliptical shape that extends on a north–south axis, with roughly 6 kilometres (3.7 mi) length and 2 kilometres (1.2 mi) width. The average depth is 8 metres (26 ft). It is located in the Eastern Ranges, on the anticlinal of Nemocón, in the northeast of the department, at an altitude of 2,800 metres (9,200 ft).

== Description ==
=== Geology and soils ===
Geologically, the lake is of Pleistocene origin and is linked to the formation of the Eastern Ranges, which had a strong uprising activity during the Pliocene. Because of its location there is a wide distribution of sedimentary rocks, and the Guadalupe Group, Guaduas, Bogotá and Cacho formations are present in the area. The basin is crossed along its axis by the Suesca Fault, uplifting sandstone.

The soils of the basin are classified as alfisols, where erosion areas are classified as "bad soils". Generally these correspond to cold and dry climates, with corrugated relief and highly evolved soils, where the presence of erosion is common, and most horizons have enrichment with clay. These soils were formed during the Pliocene and Quaternary, containing deposits of volcanic ash from the Cordillera Central, which weathered into clays, currently present in the lower strata.

=== Vegetation and climate ===
The original vegetation was composed of encenillo and "corono" forests, accompanied by more xerophytic Andean communities, which correspond to the Low montane dry forest (bs-MB) according to the Holdridge life zones. The actual land cover is dominated by exotic species, mostly Acacia decurrens, with few remnants of native vegetation in the north and south of the basin.

From a climatic point of view, the region has a bimodal rainfall regime, with an annual average of 647 mm, average temperatures of 14 °C, 70% relative humidity and evaporation of 1331 mm/year. The winds are a determinant factor for the vegetation and climate, as they are mainly influenced by Sabana de Bogotá, Magdalena River Valley and the Orinoco Plains, which converge in the area to generate specific characteristics from the point of view of moisture and the feasibility of rainfall.

The region is under the jurisdiction of the Corporación Autonoma Regional de Cundinamarca (CAR) (environmental authority) and its central axis (north–south) serves as the boundary between the municipalities of Cucunubá and Suesca.

=== Muisca sacred lake ===
As with various other lakes on the Altiplano, Tota, Siecha, Guatavita and Iguaque, the Muisca who were the original inhabitants of the area before the Spanish conquest of the Muisca, performed religious rituals at Lake Suesca.

== Environmental issues ==
The basin has suffered severe deforestation and erosion, which together have negatively affected the lake ecosystem, which added to the impact of climate change have led to a significant reduction of the water surface. Plans for sustainable development are made in recent years.

Since 1970, a soil remediation process with Acacia decurrens, Pinus patula and Eucalyptus globulus was started, but due to the lack of management, the problems related with water scarcity due to the reduction of runoff and water contained in the soil increased. Nowadays the entire basin is located within a forest reserve that has little management by the authorities.

By oral tradition, it is known that the lake had a great variety of species, such as "Guapucha" (Grundulus bogotensis) and "Capitan de la Sabana" (Eremophilus mutisii), now locally extinct due to the desiccation of the water body and the introduction of carp and trout, which also disappeared by the same effect of El Niño in 1998.

The lake is an important stop-over for many migratory birds, but few counting exercises have been made in the area.

== Places of interest ==
- "La Laguna" train station on the Bogotá Savannah Railway
- Monoliths of Suesca, protruding rock formations located at the south of the basin
- Bababuy Hill, at the north of the basin

== See also ==
- Suesca
- Lake Guatavita, Lake Herrera, Siecha Lakes, Lake Tota
