= Ubaté River =

- Location of the Ubaté River in Colombia
- Etymology: Muysccubun: "bloodied land" or "sower of the mouth"
- Native name: Río Ubaté (Spanish)

Location
- Country: Colombia
- Department: Cundinamarca
- Municipalities: Tausa; Sutatausa; Ubaté; Fúquene

Physical characteristics
- Source
  - location: Tausa
  - coordinates: 5°10′24.1″N 73°53′36.5″W
  - elevation: 3,550 m (11,650 ft)
- Mouth: Lake Fúquene
  - location: Fúquene
  - coordinates: 5°26′24.2″N 73°44′22.4″W
  - elevation: 2,543 m (8,343 ft)
- Length: 49 km (30 mi)
- Basin size: 293 km^{2} (113 sq mi)

Basin features
- River system: Confluence of El Hato River & La Playa River
- Waterbodies: Lake Fúquene

The Ubaté River is a river on the Altiplano Cundiboyacense, Cundinamarca, Colombia.

== Etymology ==
The name Ubaté comes from the native name "Ebate", in Muysccubun meaning "bloodied land" or "sower of the mouth".

== Description ==
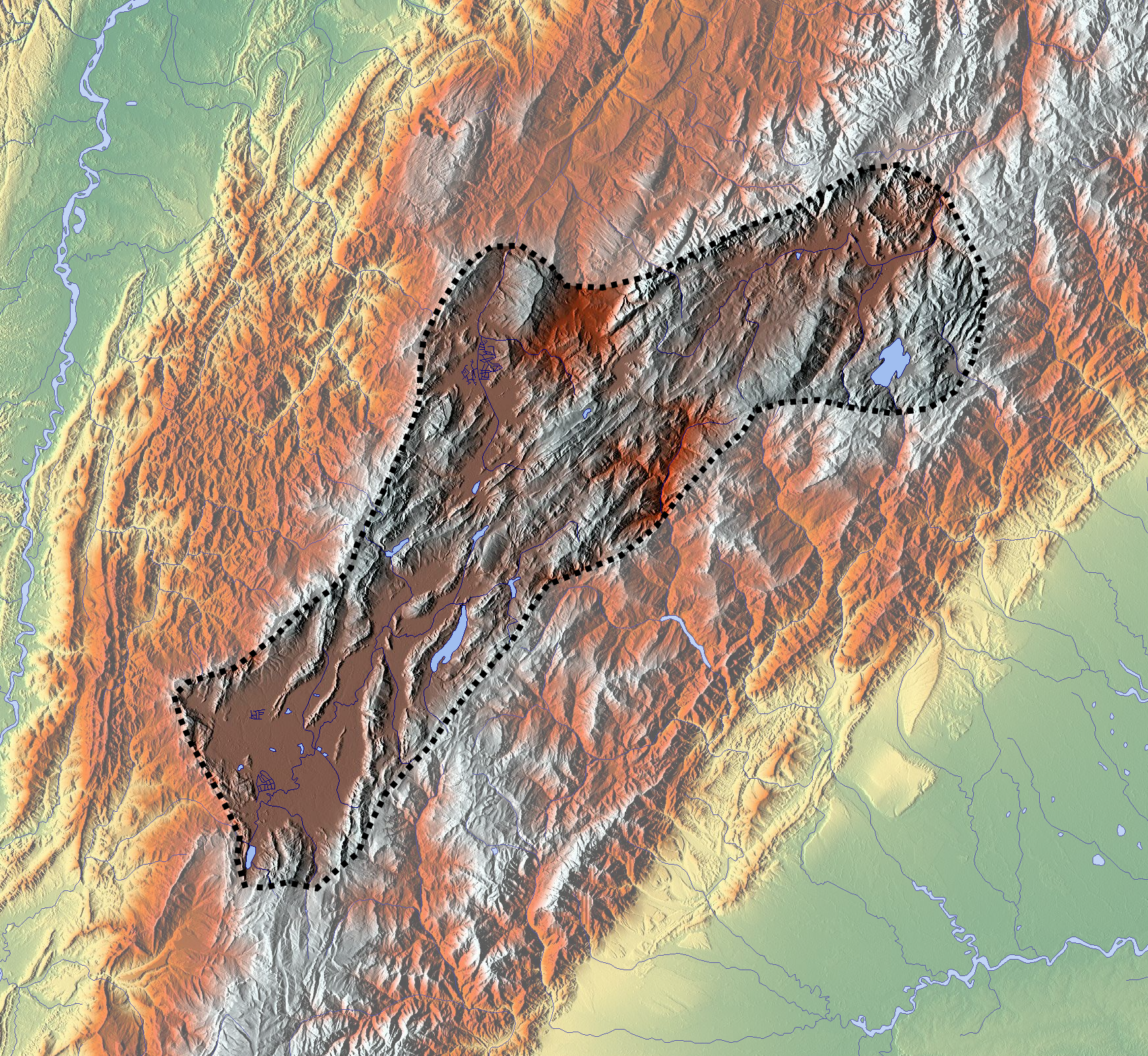
Source and mouth of the Ubaté River on the Altiplano Cundiboyacense

The Ubaté River originates as the confluence of the El Hato and La Playa Rivers. El Hato River originates in the municipality Tausa. The Ubaté River flows northward through the Ubaté-Chiquinquirá Valley and drains into Lake Fúquene, at the border with Boyacá.

== See also ==
- List of rivers of Colombia
