= Moniquirá =

- Municipality and town
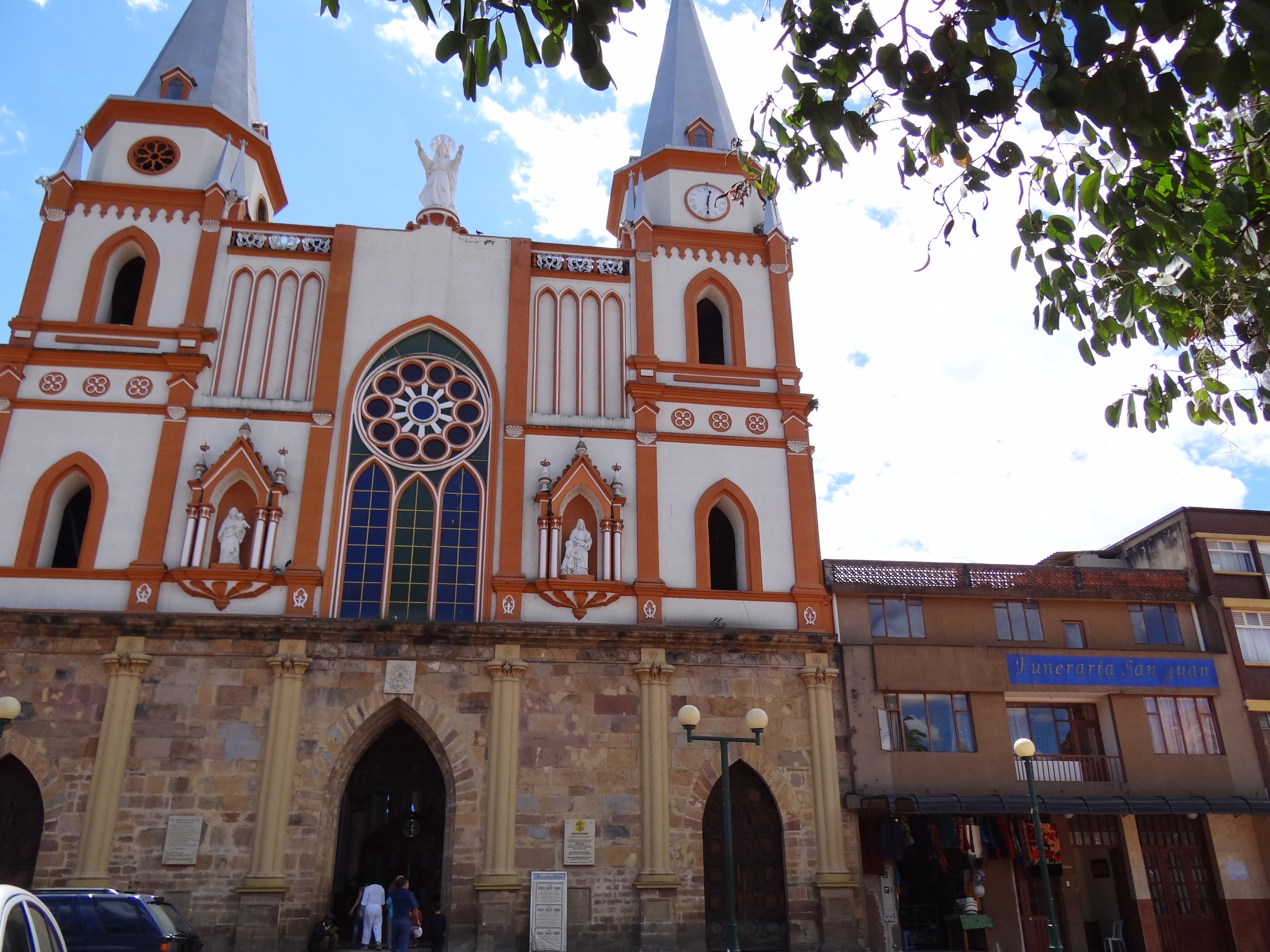
- Church of Moniquirá

- Flag Coat of arms

- Location of the municipality and town of Moniquirá in the Boyacá Department of Colombia.

- Location in Colombia Moniquirá (Boyacá Department)
- Coordinates: 5°55′N 73°30′W
- Country: Colombia
- Department: Boyacá Department
- Province: Ricaurte Province
- Founded: 26 March 1825
- Founder: Gaspar Ramírez

Government
  - Mayor: José Clodomiro Ariza Pardo (2020-2023)

Area
  - Total: 220 km^{2} (85 sq mi)
- Elevation: 1,669 m (5,476 ft)

Population (Census 2018)
  - Total: 20,848
  - Density: 95/km^{2} (250/sq mi)
- Time zone: UTC-5 (Colombia Standard Time)
- Website: Official website

Moniquirá is a town and municipality in Boyacá Department, Colombia, part of the subregion of the Ricaurte Province. It is known for its "bocadillos" and "panelitas de leche" (both little sweet cakes). Moniquirá borders San José de Pare in the north, Togüí and Arcabuco in the east, Gachantivá and Santa Sofia in the south and in the west with the department of Santander.

== Etymology ==
In the Chibcha language of the Muisca, Moniquirá means "place of bath".

== History ==
Before the arrival of the Spanish conquistadores, Moniquirá was who were ruled by the cacique of Susa, part of the Muisca Confederation. Gonzalo Jiménez de Quesada passed through Ubaza, part of Moniquirá on March 16, 1537.

== Economy ==
Main economical activity of Moniquirá is agriculture; coffee, sugar cane and maize. The bocadillos industry provides employment for over 800 people.

== Climate ==
Climate data for Moniquirá (Bertha), elevation 1,700 m (5,600 ft), (1981–2010)
Month	Jan	Feb	Mar	Apr	May	Jun	Jul	Aug	Sep	Oct	Nov	Dec	Year
Mean daily maximum °C (°F)	26.7 (80.1)	26.7 (80.1)	27.0 (80.6)	26.5 (79.7)	26.3 (79.3)	26.0 (78.8)	25.8 (78.4)	26.1 (79.0)	26.1 (79.0)	25.7 (78.3)	26.0 (78.8)	26.2 (79.2)	26.3 (79.3)
Daily mean °C (°F)	19.0 (66.2)	19.3 (66.7)	19.6 (67.3)	19.5 (67.1)	19.3 (66.7)	19.1 (66.4)	18.7 (65.7)	18.9 (66.0)	18.9 (66.0)	18.8 (65.8)	19.1 (66.4)	19.0 (66.2)	19.1 (66.4)
Mean daily minimum °C (°F)	12.8 (55.0)	13.1 (55.6)	13.6 (56.5)	14.5 (58.1)	14.4 (57.9)	13.4 (56.1)	12.5 (54.5)	12.6 (54.7)	13.0 (55.4)	13.9 (57.0)	14.1 (57.4)	13.2 (55.8)	13.4 (56.1)
Average precipitation mm (inches)	62.0 (2.44)	93.3 (3.67)	111.9 (4.41)	236.0 (9.29)	298.2 (11.74)	186.7 (7.35)	152.3 (6.00)	150.8 (5.94)	208.1 (8.19)	240.8 (9.48)	177.4 (6.98)	88.9 (3.50)	2,006.3 (78.99)
Average precipitation days (≥ 1.0 mm)	11	15	15	24	26	20	19	20	23	25	20	14	234
Average relative humidity (%)	74	74	74	78	80	77	75	74	76	79	79	77	77
Mean monthly sunshine hours	176.7	163.7	151.9	126.0	120.9	141.0	151.9	148.8	141.0	145.7	153.0	167.4	1,788
Mean daily sunshine hours	5.7	5.8	4.9	4.2	3.9	4.7	4.9	4.8	4.7	4.7	5.1	5.4	4.9
Source: Instituto de Hidrologia Meteorologia y Estudios Ambientales

== Gallery ==
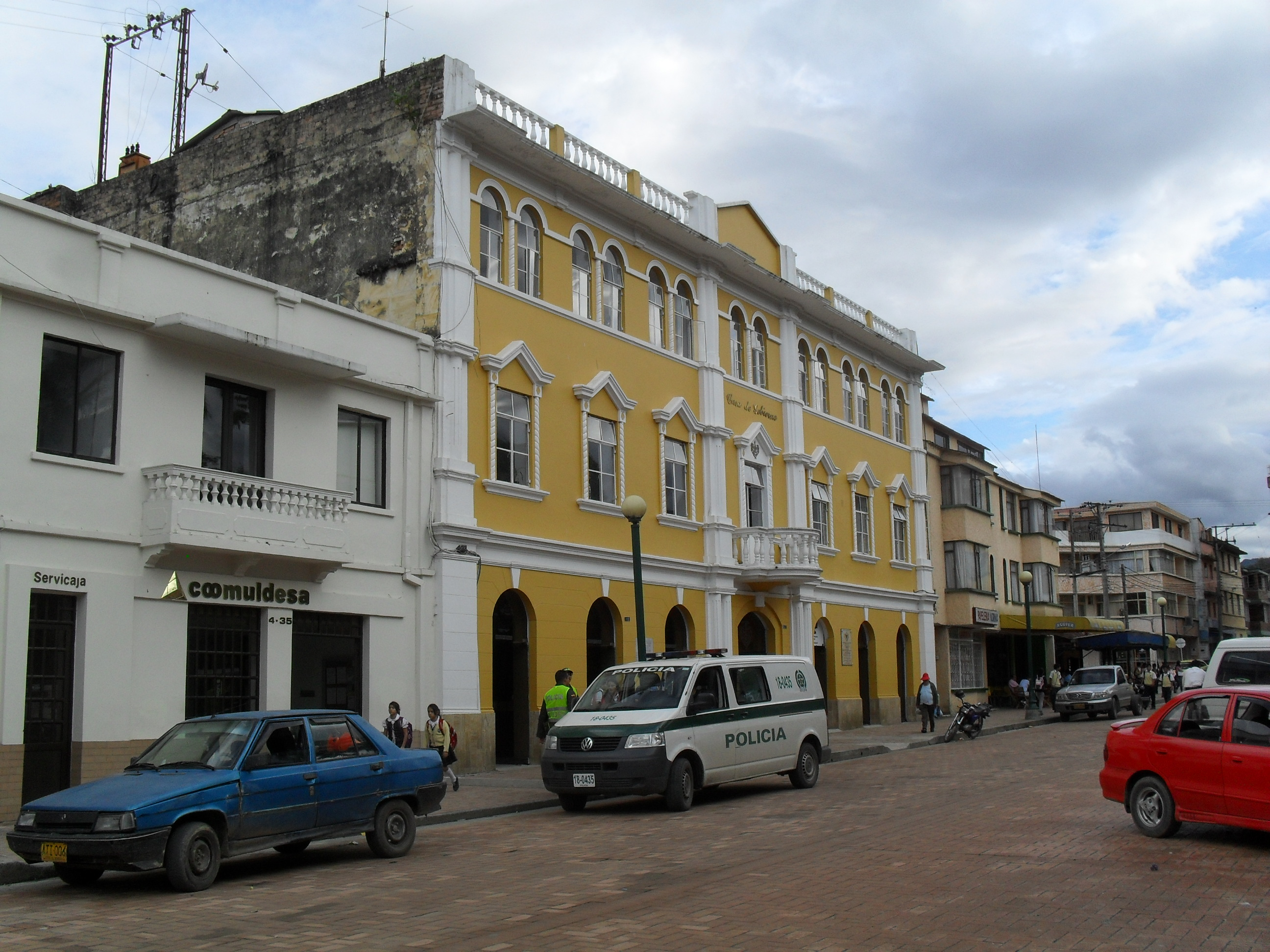
Council house

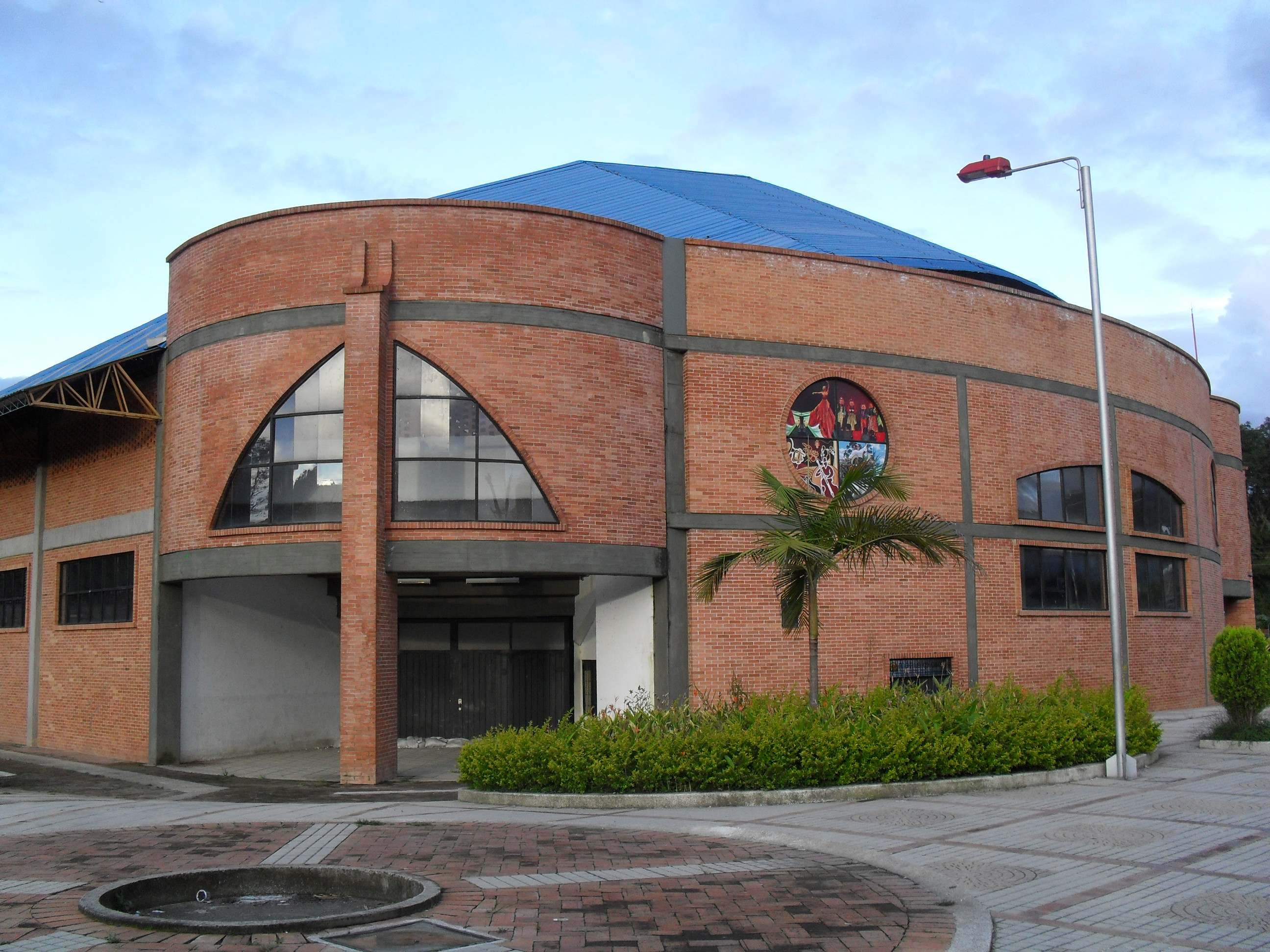
Colliseum

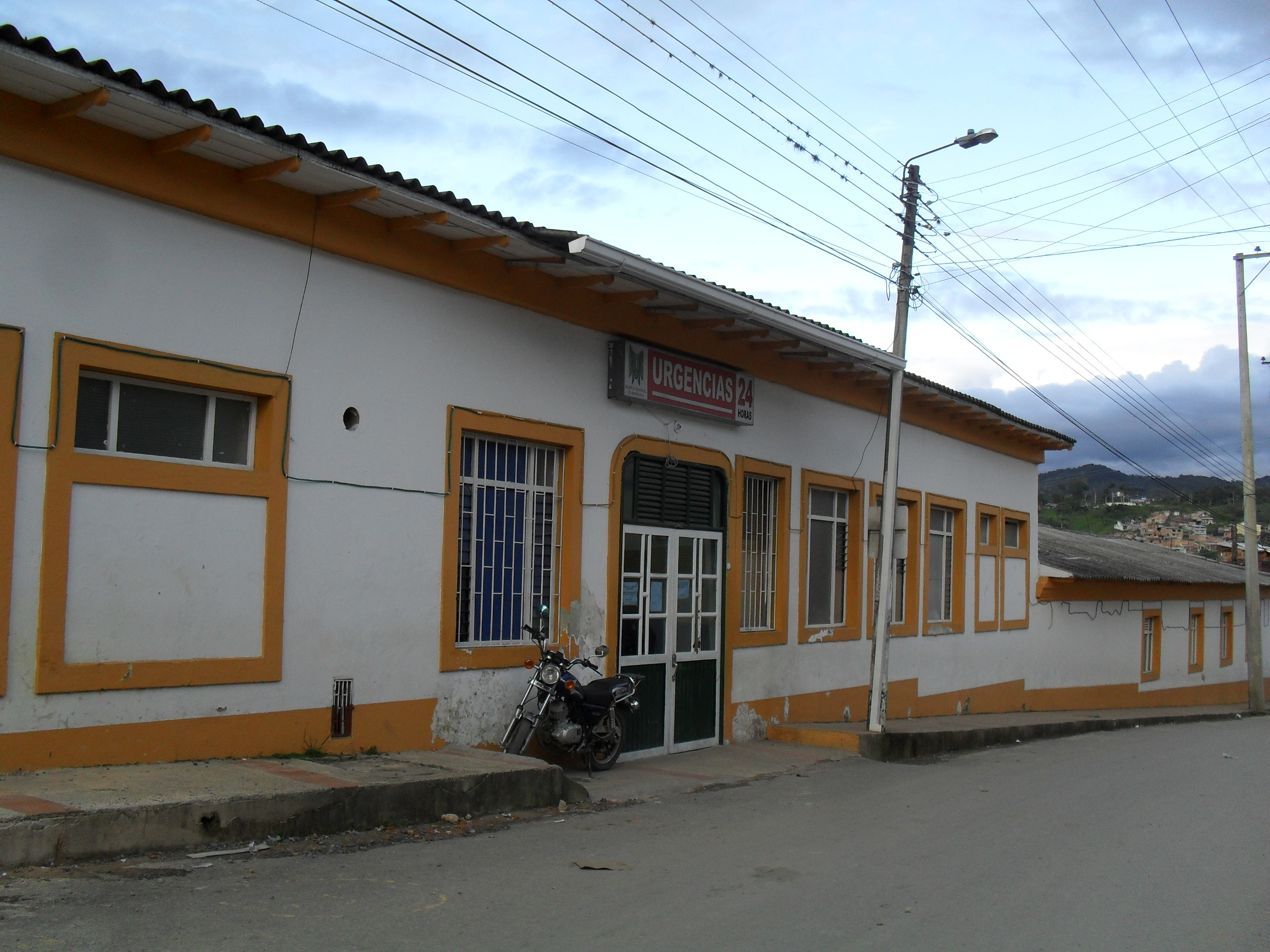
Hospital

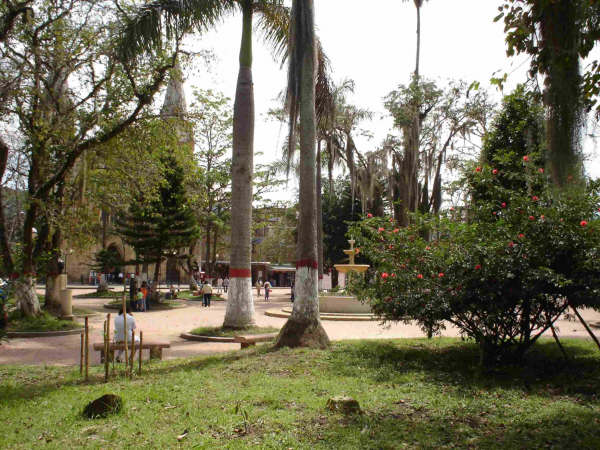
Park

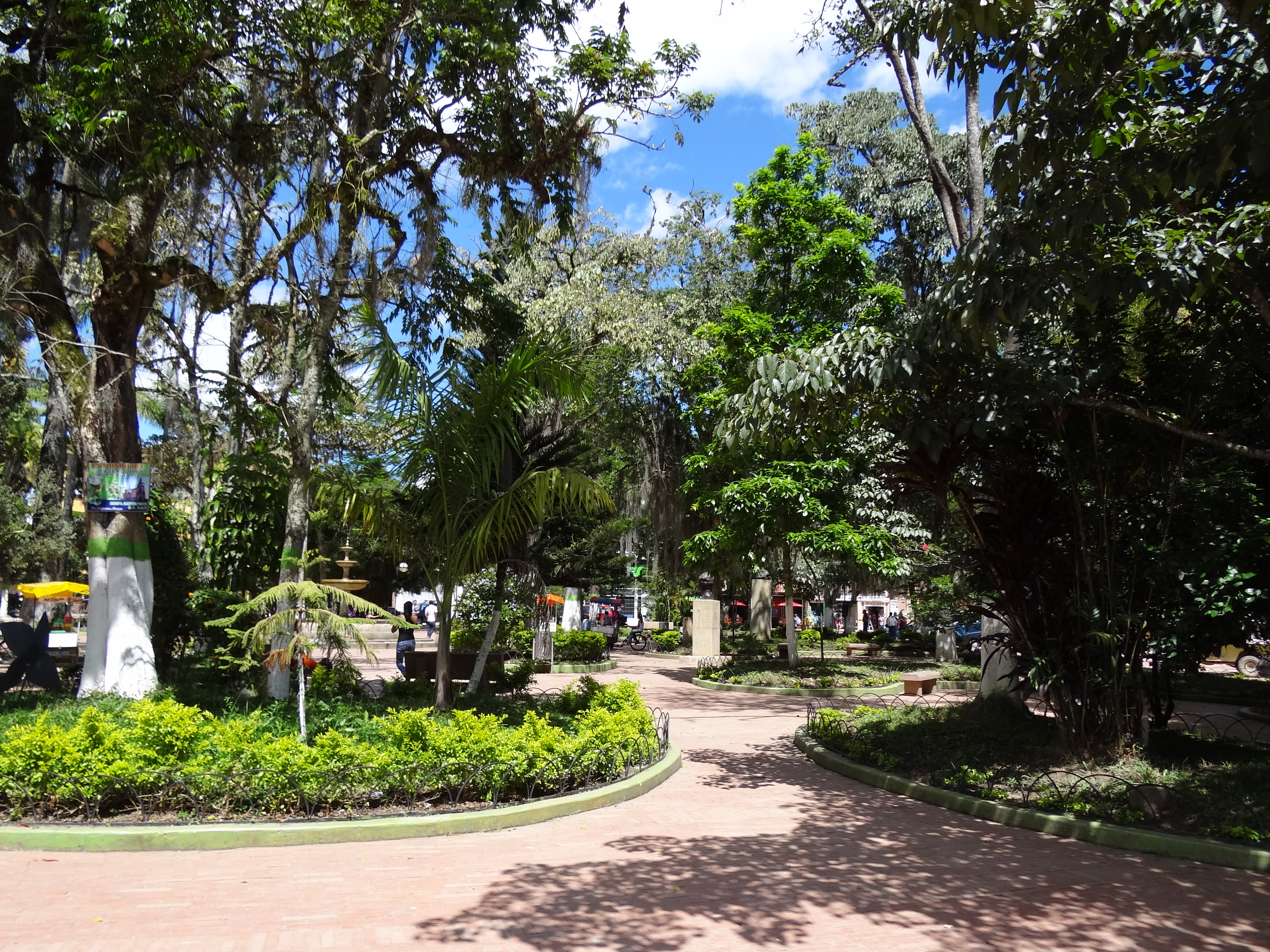
Park

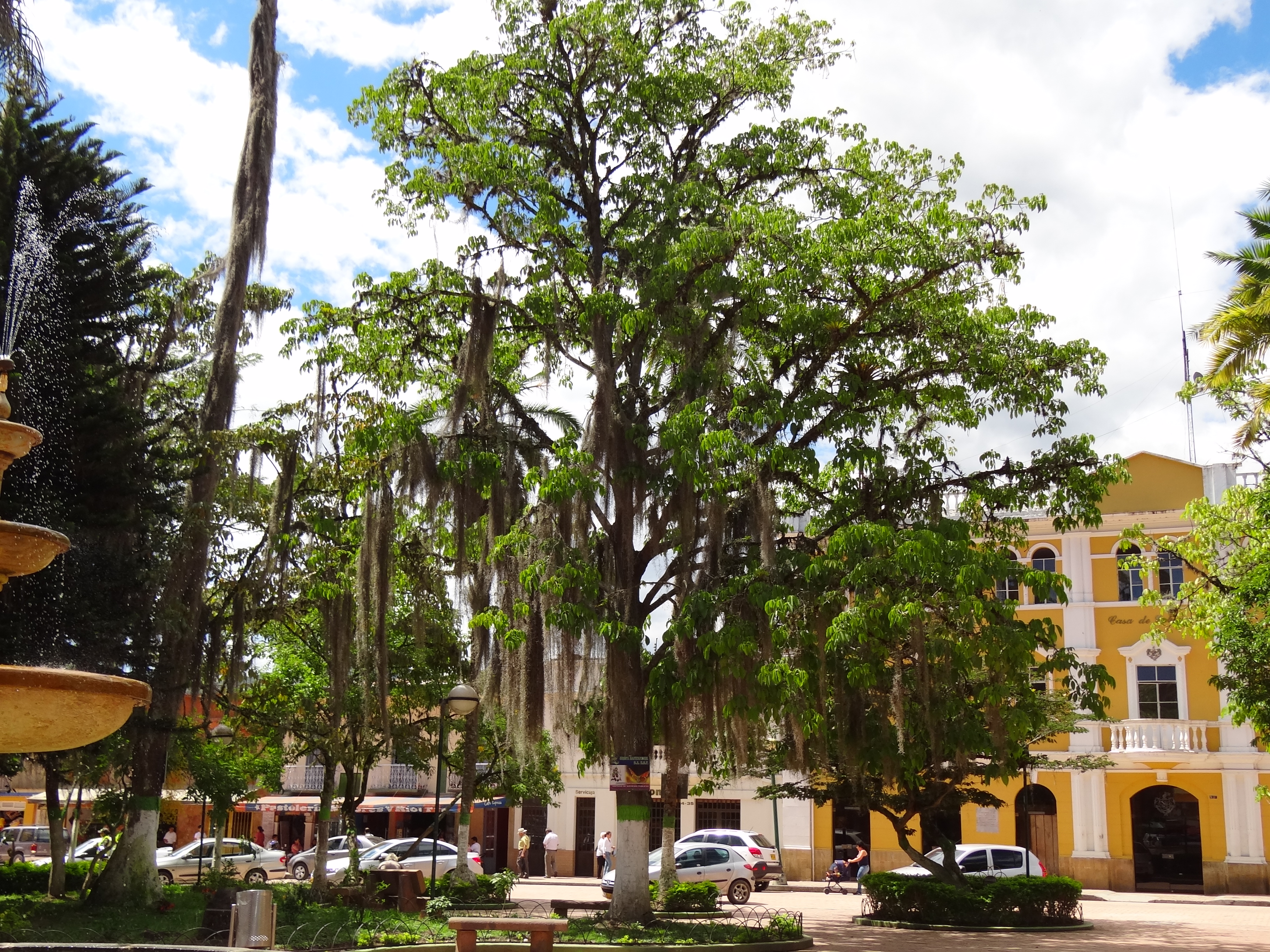
Park
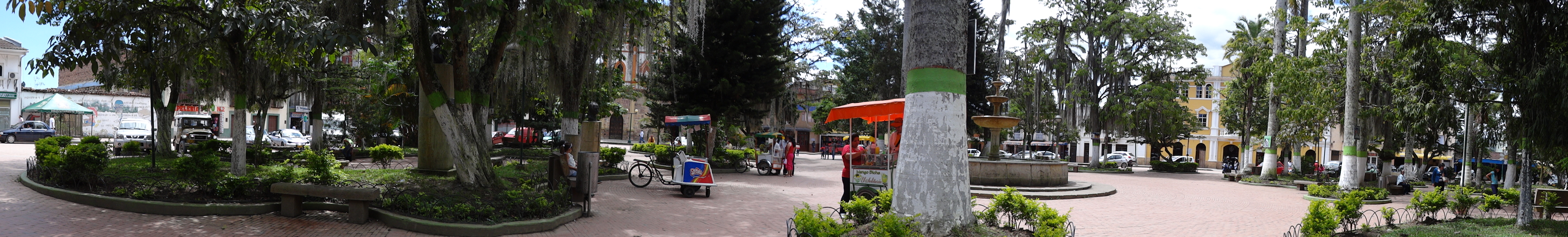
Panorama Moniquirá park
