= List of municipalities in Cundinamarca =

List of Municipalities in Cundinamarca Department:

1. Agua de Dios
2. Albán, Cundinamarca
3. Anapoima
4. Anolaima
5. Apulo
6. Arbeláez
7. Beltrán, Cundinamarca
8. Bituima
9. Bojacá
10. Cabrera, Cundinamarca
11. Cachipay, Cundinamarca
12. Cajicá
13. Caparrapí
14. Cáqueza
15. Carmen de Carupa
16. Chaguaní
17. Chipaque
18. Choachí
19. Chocontá
20. Chía, Cundinamarca
21. Cogua
22. Cota
23. Cucunubá
24. El Colegio
25. El Peñón
26. El Rosal, Cundinamarca
27. Facatativá
28. Fómeque
29. Fosca, Cundinamarca
30. Funza
31. Fusagasugá
32. Fúquene
33. Gachalá
34. Gachancipá
35. Gachetá
36. Gama, Cundinamarca
37. Girardot, Cundinamarca
38. Granada, Cundinamarca
39. Guachetá
40. Guaduas
41. Guasca
42. Guataquí
43. Guatavita
44. Guayabal de Síquima
45. Guayabetal
46. Gutiérrez, Cundinamarca
47. Jerusalén, Cundinamarca
48. Junín, Cundinamarca
49. La Calera, Cundinamarca
50. La Mesa, Cundinamarca
51. La Palma, Cundinamarca
52. La Peña, Cundinamarca
53. La Vega, Cundinamarca
54. Lenguazaque
55. Machetá
56. Madrid, Cundinamarca
57. Manta, Cundinamarca
58. Medina, Cundinamarca
59. Mosquera, Cundinamarca
60. Nariño, Cundinamarca
61. Nemocón
62. Nilo, Cundinamarca
63. Nimaima
64. Nocaima
65. Pacho
66. Paime
67. Pandi, Cundinamarca
68. Paratebueno
69. Pasca
70. Puerto Salgar
71. Pulí, Cundinamarca
72. Quebradanegra
73. Quetame
74. Quipile
75. Ricaurte, Cundinamarca
76. San Antonio del Tequendama
77. San Bernardo, Cundinamarca
78. San Cayetano, Cundinamarca
79. San Francisco, Cundinamarca
80. San Juan de Rioseco
81. Sasaima
82. Sesquilé
83. Sibaté
84. Silvania
85. Simijaca
86. Soacha
87. Sopó
88. Subachoque
89. Suesca
90. Supatá
91. Susa, Cundinamarca
92. Sutatausa
93. Tabio
94. Tausa
95. Tena, Cundinamarca
96. Tenjo
97. Tibacuy
98. Tibiritá
99. Tocaima
100. Tocancipá
101. Topaipí
102. Ubalá
103. Ubaque
104. Ubaté
105. Une
106. Útica
107. Venecia, Cundinamarca
108. Vergara, Cundinamarca
109. Vianí
110. Villagómez
111. Villapinzón
112. Villeta, Cundinamarca
113. Viotá
114. Yacopí
115. Zipacón
116. Zipaquirá
