= Carmen de Carupa =

- Municipality and town
- Flag Coat of arms

- Location in Colombia
- Coordinates: 5°21′1″N 73°54′19″W
- Country: Colombia
- Departamento: Cundinamarca
- Province: Ubaté Province
- Founded: 20 July 1808
- Founder: José Joaquín Urdaneta and Doña Ventura

Government
  - Mayor: Alejandro Ortiz Puentes (2016-2019)

Area
  - Municipality and town: 228 km^{2} (88 sq mi)
  - Urban: 0.45 km^{2} (0.17 sq mi)
- Elevation: 2,600 m (8,500 ft)

Population (2015)
  - Municipality and town: 9,109
  - Density: 40.0/km^{2} (103/sq mi)
  - Urban: 2,374
- Time zone: UTC-5 (COT)
  - Summer (DST): UTC-5 (COT)
- Website: Official website

Carmen de Carupa is a municipality and town of Colombia in the Ubaté Province, part of the department of Cundinamarca. The municipality, located in the Ubaté-Chiquinquirá Valley on the Altiplano Cundiboyacense borders San Cayetano in the west, Tausa and Sutatausa in the south, Ubaté and Susa in the east and Simijaca and Buenavista and Coper (Boyacá) in the north.

== History ==
The area around Carmen de Carupa was before the arrival of the Spanish conquistadors inhabited by the Muisca. The cacique of Ubaté ruled over the territories of Carmen de Carupa. The western and northern neighbouring indigenous group of Carmen de Carupa was the Muzo.

Modern Carmen de Carupa was founded on July 20, 1808 by José Joaquín Urdaneta and Doña Ventura.

== Economy ==
Main economical activity in Carmen de Carupa is agriculture, predominantly potatoes.
