= Carl Henrik Langebaek =

Colombian anthropologist, archaeologist and historian

dr. Carl Henrik Langebaek
- Born: 1961 (age 64–65); Bogotá, Colombia
- Education: University of Pittsburgh
- Known for: Muisca studies, coca research
- Awards: Premio Alejandro Ángel Escobar en Ciencias Sociales y Humanas, 2009
- Scientific career
- Fields: Archaeology, anthropology, history
- Workplaces: Universidad de Los Andes
- Thesis: Patterns of Coca consumptions in Northern South America (1993)

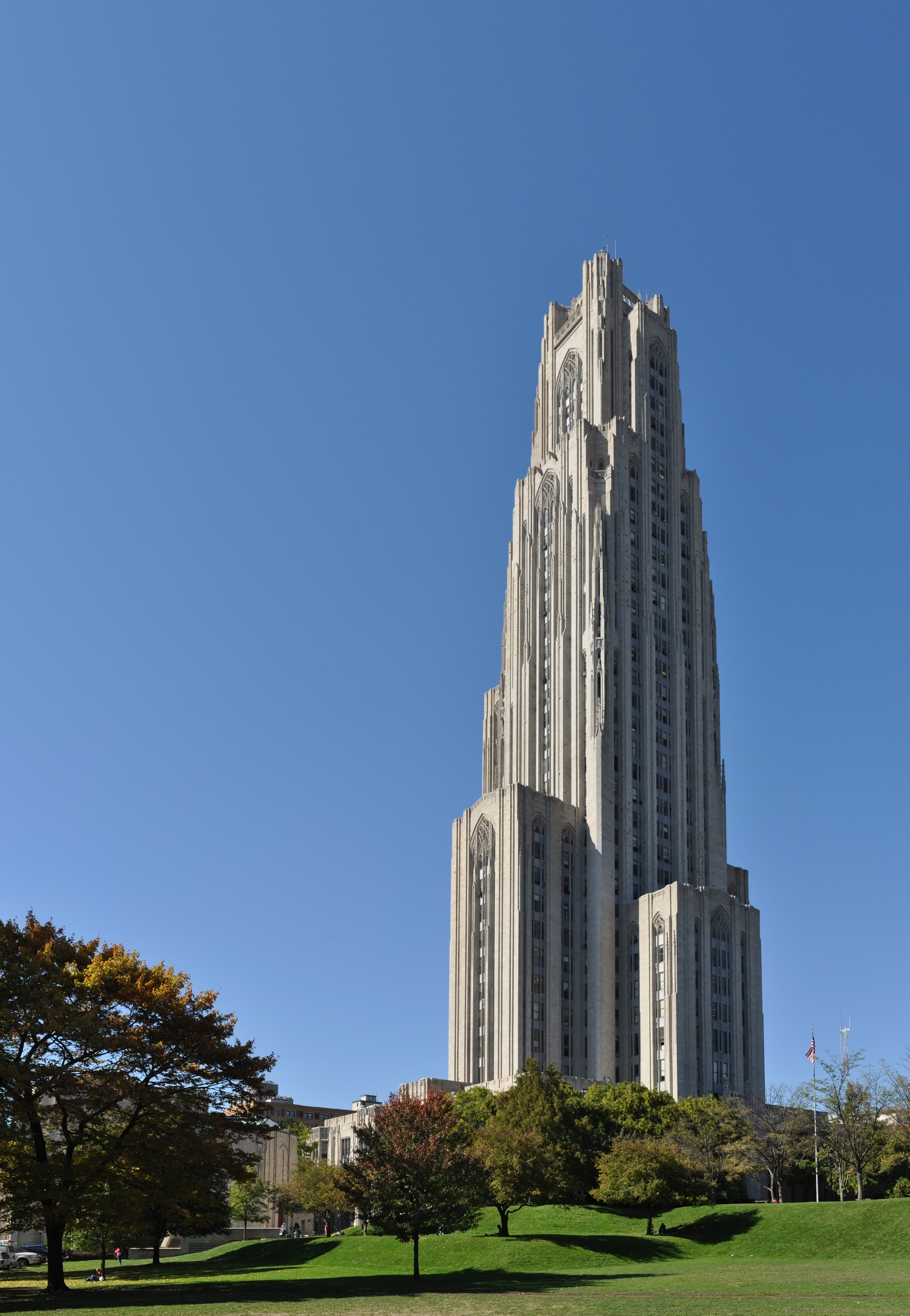
University of Pittsburgh, where Langebaek obtained his PhD in 1993

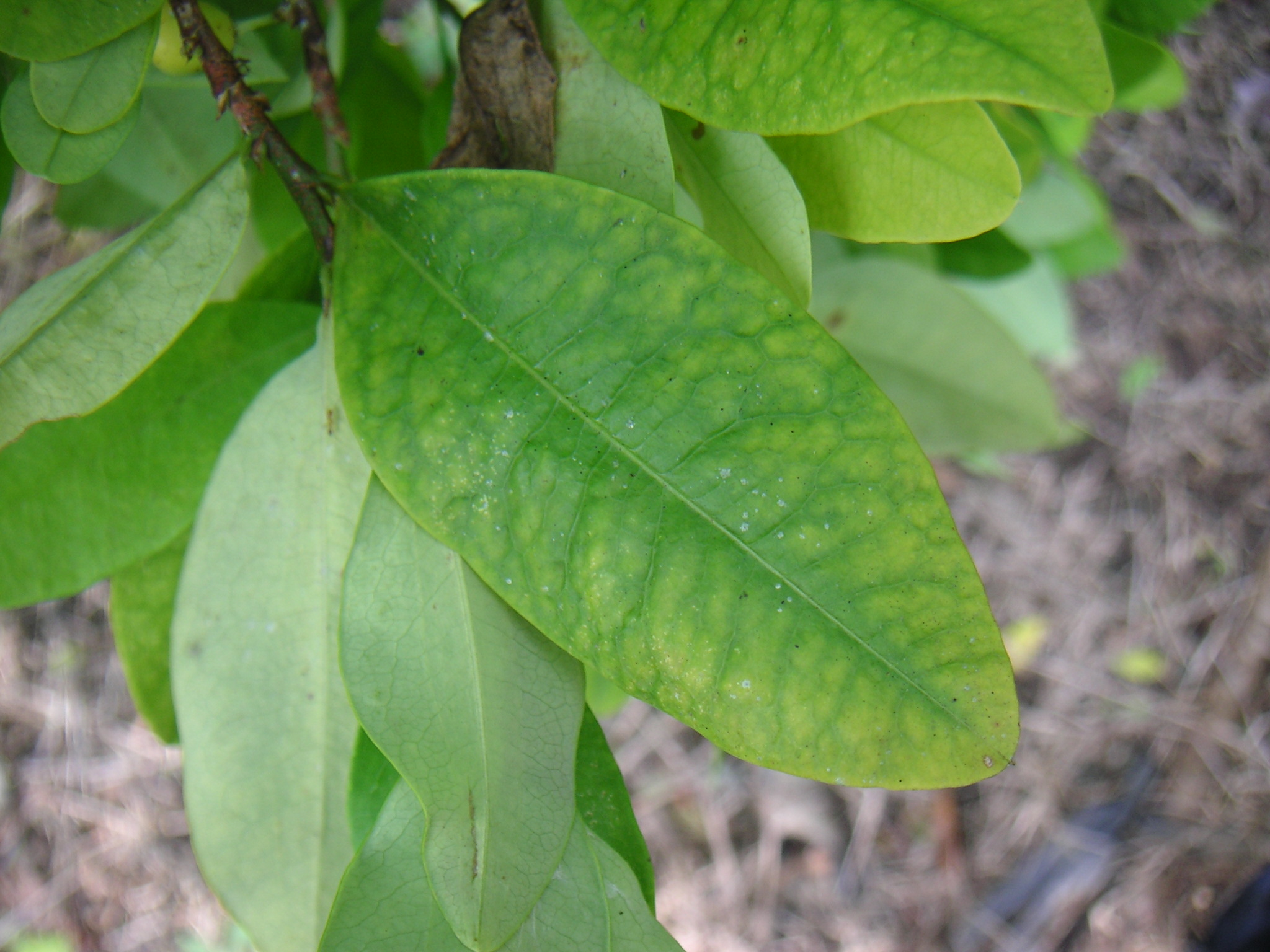
The use of coca, the subject of his PhD

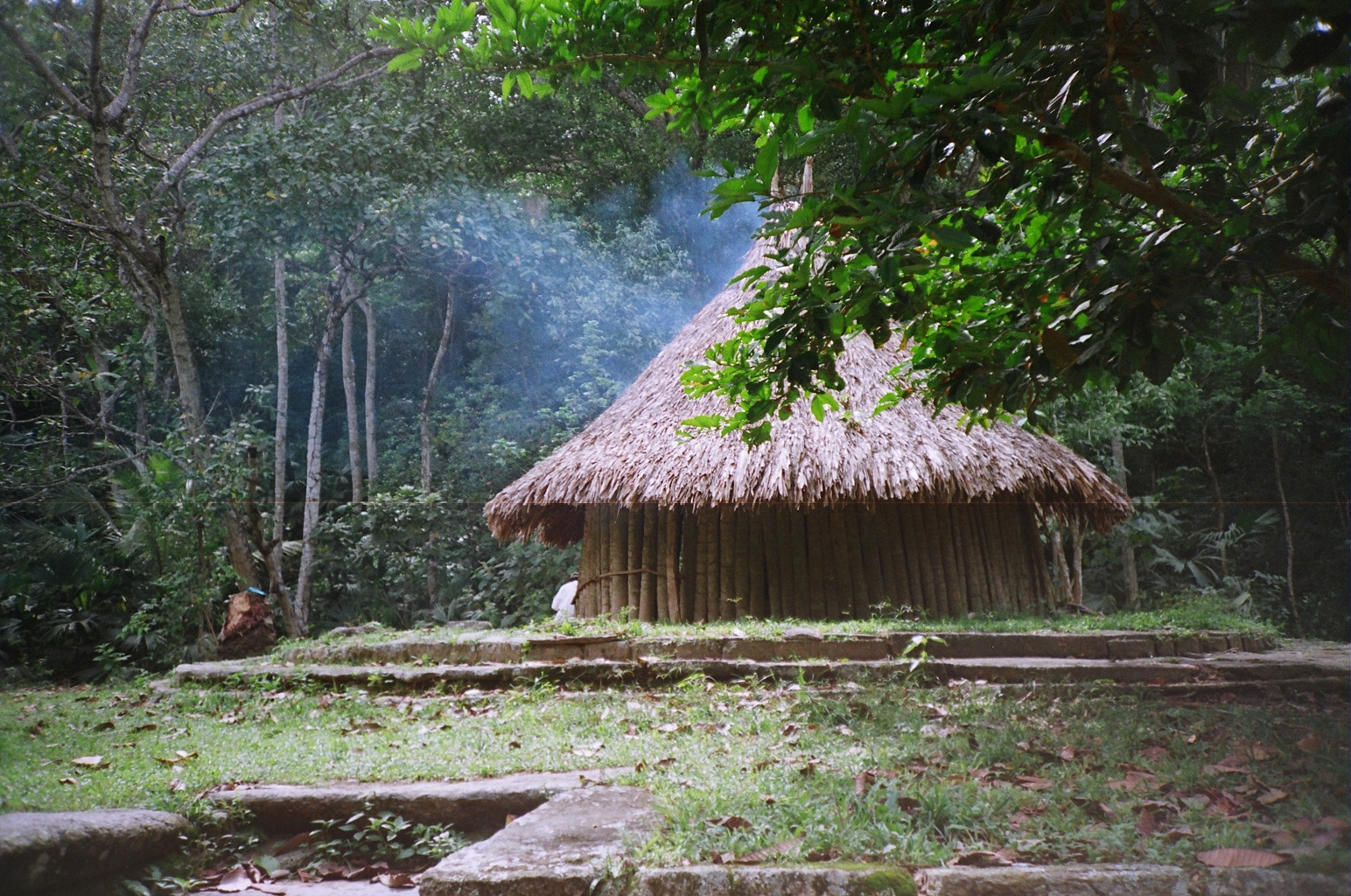
Langebaek investigated the anthropology of National Park Tayrona

Carl Henrik Langebaek Rueda (Bogotá, 1961) is a Colombian anthropologist, archaeologist and historian. He has been contributing on the knowledge of archaeological evidences, especially the Herrera Period and the Muisca. Langebaek was vice-chancellor for academic affairs at Universidad de los Andes.

== Biography ==
Carl Henrik Langebaek Rueda was born in the Colombian capital Bogotá as son of a Danish father, also an anthropologist, and Colombian mother. He attended the Gimnasio Moderno in the city. Langebaek did his undergraduate studies in anthropology at the Universidad de Los Andes from 1980 to 1985 and his Master's from 1988 to 1993 at the University of Pittsburgh, graduating with a thesis called Regional Archaeology in the Muisca Territory. The case of Fúquene and Susa. During the same years Langebaek performed his doctoral publishing his PhD thesis in 1993 under the title Patterns of Coca consumptions in Northern South America. The anthropologist has spent eight years in the archives looking for information on the indigenous peoples he assessed in his work.

Since 1992 Langebaek is associate professor at the Universidad de Los Andes in Bogotá and from 2000 to 2011 he was the dean of the Faculty of Social Sciences of the university.

Langebaek Rueda is rector of the university of entrepreneurs, Uniempresarial. Leading institution in the dual model in Colombia, therefore he becomes an honorary ambassador of the Dual Model in the country due to its transformative impact on training and employability.

Langebaek has worked in National Park Tayrona, Fúquene Valley, Barichara, Bahía de Neguaje and north Ecuador and his heroes are Charles Darwin and Niels Bohr.

Carl Henrik Langebaek has stated that agriculture and the hunter-gatherer society are not mutually exclusive and while the access to agriculture is there, the society can continue living off hunter-gathering techniques. The potato and maize are not originally from Colombia, yet from Peru and Mexico respectively and were cultivated on the Altiplano Cundiboyacense during the Herrera Period, around 3000 BP (1000 BCE).

In 2009 the Premio Alejandro Ángel Escobar en Ciencias Sociales y Humanas was awarded to Langebaek for his book Los herederos del pasado. Indígenas y pensamiento criollo en Colombia y Venezuela.

== Works ==
This list is a selection.

=== Books ===
- 2021 - Antes de Colombia
- 2019 - Los muiscas. La historia milenaria de un pueblo chibcha. Bogotá
- 2009 - Los herederos del pasado : indígenas y pensamiento criollo en Colombia y Venezuela. Bogotá: Universidad de los Andes: Ediciones Uniandes
- 2007 - Indios y españoles en la antigua provincia de Santa Marta, Colombia: documentos de los siglos XVI y XVII
- 2006 - El diablo vestido de negro y los cunas del Darién en el siglo XVIII: Jacobo Walburger y su Breve noticia de la provincia del Darién, de la ley y costumbres de los yndios, de la poca esperanza de plantar nuestra fé, y del número de sus naturales, 1748
- 2002 - Arqueología y guerra en el Valle de Aburrá: estudio de cambios sociales en una región del noroccidente del Colombia
- 2000 - Arqueología en el Bajo Magdalena: un estudio de los primeros agricultores del Caribe colombiano
- 2000 - Arqueología regional en el valle de Veiva: Procesos de ocupación humana en una región de los Andes orientales de Colombia. Bogotá: Instituto Colombiano de Antropología e Historia.
- 1998 - Medio ambiente y poblamiento en La Guajira : investigaciones arqueológicas en el ranchería medio
- 1996 - Noticias de caciques muy mayores: orígen y desarrollo de sociedades complejas en el nororiente de Colombia y norte de Venezuela
- 1995 - Regional archaeology in the Muisca territory: a study of the Fúquene and Susa valleys. Pittsburgh: University of Pittsburgh; Bogotá: Universidad de los Andes.
- 1992 - Noticias de caciques mayores: Origen y desarrollo de sociedades complejas en el nororiente de Colombia y el norte de Venezuela
- 1987 - Mercados, poblamiento e integración étnica entre los muiscas, siglo XVI. Bogotá: Banco de la República.
- 1985 - Cuando los muiscas diversificaron la agricultura y crearon el intercambio

=== Articles ===
- 2011. (with co-authors) "Condiciones de vida y jerarquías sociales en el norte de Suraméerica : el caso de la población muisca en Tibanica, Soacha". Indiana no. 28 (2011) 15-34
- 2005 - "The Pre-Hispanic Population of the Santa Marta Bays. A Contribution to the Study of the Development of the Northern Colombian Tairona Chiefdom"
- 2001 - "Arqueología regional en el Valle de Leiva: procesos de ocupación humana en una región de los Andes orientales de Colombia"
- 2000 - "Cacicazgos, orfebrería y política prehispánica: una perspectiva desde Colombia"
- 1996 - "Arqueología de nosotros mismos. Deterioro ambiental en la laguna de Fúquene"
- 1996 - "De cómo convertir a los indios y de porqué no lo han sido: Juan de Valcarcel y la idolatría en el altiplano cundiboyacense a finales del siglo XVII"
- 1994 - "La élite no siempre piensa lo mismo. Indígenas, estado, arqueología y etnohistoria en Colombia"
- 1992 - "Cuna Chiefs long distance travels: the result of the Conquest"
- 1992 - "El uso de adornos de metal y la existencia de sociedades complejas: una visión desde Centro de Suramérica"
- 1992 - "Competencia por el prestigio político y momificación en el norte de Suramérica y el Istmo, siglo XVI"
- 1990 - "Patologías y la hipótesis de la economía autosuficiente muisca"
- 1990 - "Buscando Sacerdotes y encontrando chuques: sobre la organización religiosa de los cacicazgos muiscas". Revista de Antropología y Arqueología 6, no. 1.

== See also ==
- List of Muisca scholars
- Muisca
- tunjo
- El Infiernito

== Notable works by Langebaek Rueda ==
- Langebaek Rueda, Carl Henrik; Bernal, Marcela; Aristizabal, Lucero; Corcione, María Antonieta; Rojas, Camilo; Santa, Tatiana (2011), "Condiciones de vida y jerarquías sociales en el norte de Suramérica: el caso de la población muisca en Tibanica, Soacha - Life conditions and social hierarchies in the north of South America: the case of the Muisca population in Tibanica, Soacha", Indiana (in Spanish), 28, Ibero-Amerikanisches Institut Preußischer Kulturbesitz: 15–34
- Langebaek Rueda, Carl Henrik (2005a), "La élite no siempre piensa lo mismo - The elite does not always think the same", Muiscas: representaciones, cartografías y etnopolíticas de la memoria (in Spanish), Universidad La Javeriana, pp. 180–199, ISBN 958-683-643-6
- Langebaek Rueda, Carl Henrik (2005b), "Fiestas y caciques muiscas en el Infiernito, Colombia: un análisis de la relación entre festejos y organización política - Festivities and Muisca caciques in El Infiernito, Colombia: an analysis of the relation between celebrations and political organisation", Boletín de Arqueología (in Spanish), 9, PUCP: 281–295, doi:10.18800/boletindearqueologiapucp.200501.011, ISSN 1029-2004
- Langebaek Rueda, Carl Henrik (2005c), Resistencia indígena y transformaciones ideológicas entre los muiscas de los siglos XVI y XVII - Indigenous resistance and ideological transformations among the Muisca in the 16th and 17th century (PDF) (in Spanish), Pontificia Universidad Javeriana, pp. 24–53, ISBN 958-683-643-6
- Langebaek Rueda, Carl Henrik (1995a), "Heterogeneidad vs. homogeneidad en la arqueología colombiana: una nota crítica y el ejemplo de la orfebrería - Heterogeneity vs. homogeneity in the Colombian archaeology: a critical note and the example of the metallurgy", Revista de antropología y arqueología (in Spanish), 11: 3–36
- Langebaek Rueda, Carl Henrik (1995b), Los caminos aborígenes - The indigenous roads, Bogotá, Colombia: Banco de la República
- Langebaek Rueda, Carl Henrik (1995c), "De cómo convertir a los indios y de porqué no lo han sido. Juan de Varcarcel y la idolatría en el altiplano cundiboyacense a finales del siglo XVII - How to convert the indians and why they didn't. Juan de Varcarcel and the idolatry on the Altiplano Cundiboyacense at the end of the 17th century", Revista de Antropología y Arqueología (in Spanish), 11, Universidad de los Andes: 187–234
- Langebaek Rueda, Carl Henrik (1995d), Arqueología Regional en el Territorio Muisca: Juego de Datos del Proyecto Valle de Fúquene - Regional Archaeology in the Muisca Territory: A Study of the Fúquene and Susa Valleys (in Spanish), Center for Comparative Arch, University of Pittsburgh, pp. 1–215, ISBN 9781877812347
- Langebaek Rueda, Carl Henrik (1985), "Cuando los muiscas diversificaron la agricultura y crearon el intercambio - When the Muisca diversified the agriculture and created the exchange", Boletín Cultural y Bibliográfico (in Spanish), 22 (3), Banco de la República: 1–8
