= Simijaca =

- Municipality and town
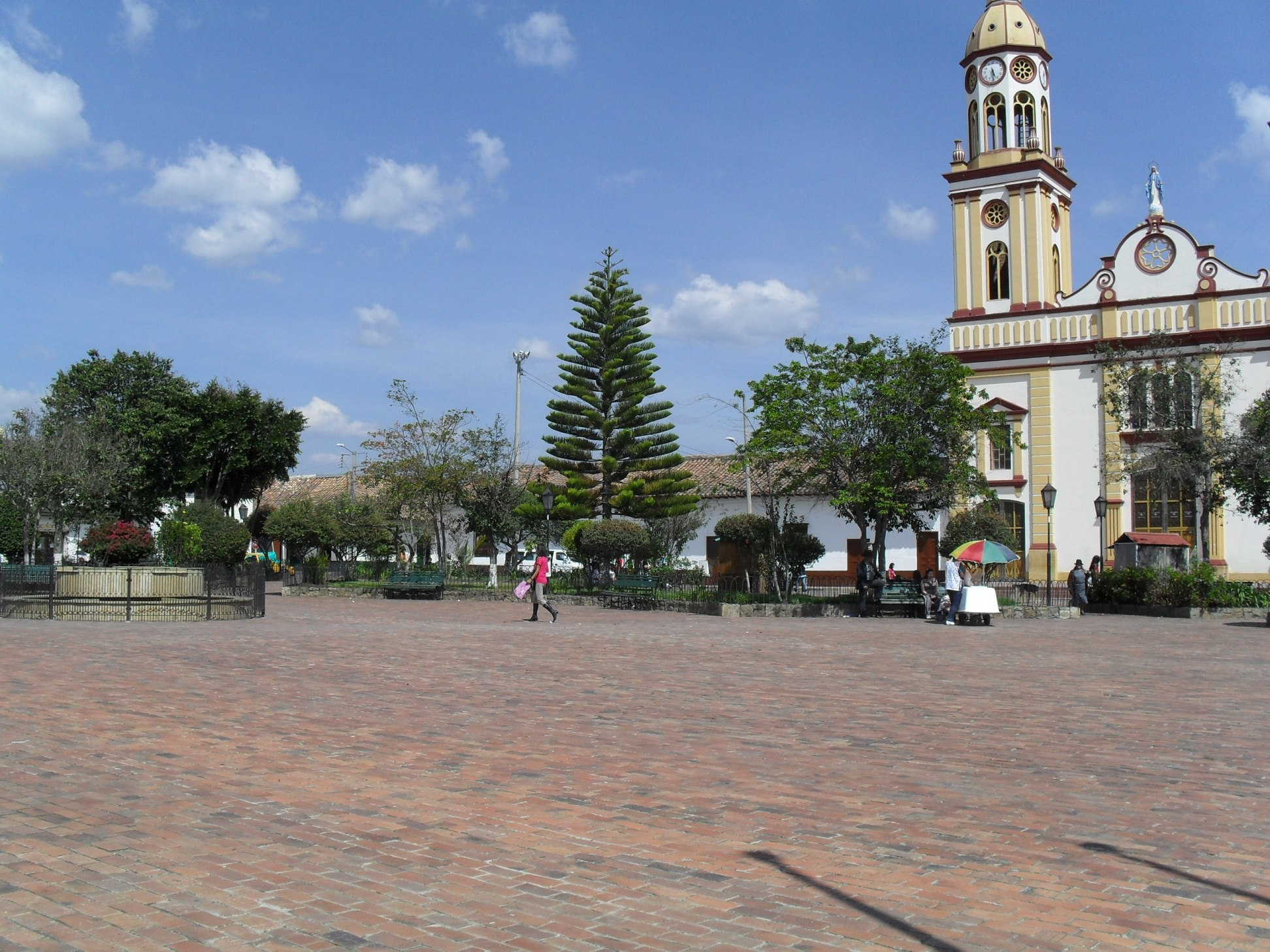
- Central square of Simijaca

- Flag Seal

- Location of the municipality and town inside Cundinamarca Department of Colombia

- Location in Colombia
- Coordinates: 5°30′7″N 73°51′7″W
- Country: Colombia
- Department: Cundinamarca
- Province: Ubaté Province
- Founded: 14 August 1600
- Founder: Luis Enríquez & Juan López de Linares

Government
  - Mayor: Edgar Aguilar Castro (2020–2023)

Area
  - Municipality and town: 107 km^{2} (41 sq mi)
  - Urban: 0.8 km^{2} (0.31 sq mi)
- Elevation: 2,559 m (8,396 ft)

Population (2015)
  - Municipality and town: 13,077
  - Density: 122/km^{2} (317/sq mi)
  - Urban: 7,293
- Time zone: UTC-5 (Colombia Standard Time)
- Website: Official website

Simijaca (Spanish pronunciation: [simiˈxaka]) is a town and municipality in the Ubaté Province, part of the Cundinamarca Department, Colombia. The town centre is located at an altitude of 2,559 metres (8,396 ft) on the Altiplano Cundiboyacense at 136 kilometres (85 mi) from the capital Bogotá. Simijaca borders the Boyacá municipalities Chiquinquirá and Caldas in the north, Susa and Carmen de Carupa in the south, Caldas in the west and San Miguel de Sema in the east.

== Etymology ==
Simijaca means in the Chibcha language of the Muisca "Blue sky" and "Nose of the white owl".

== History ==
The area of Simijaca before the Spanish conquest was part of the Muisca Confederation. Initially loyal to the zaque of Hunza, Simijaca changed rule around 1490 when it was submitted by zipa Saguamanchica.

The first Spanish establishment was done by Rodrigo Mexia Serrano on February 26, 1586. However, this population was ephemeral. And when the oidor (judge) Luis Enrique did a visitation, in July 1600, the natives had not populated the town and the entrusted had not built the church. By act on August 14, 1600, carried out by Luis Enríquez & Juan López de Linares in Cucunubá, the new and actual town of Simijaca was established. It was formed by indigenous people from Simijaca, Fúquene and Nemoguá.

== Economy ==
Main economical activity in Simijaca is agriculture with products onions, beans, maize, potatoes, milk and peas as most important agricultural products.

== Geology ==
The Upper Cretaceous Simijaca Formation is named after Simijaca.

== Communications ==
Simijaca has its own TV Station, ACOTV, which is available through analogue cable.

The High School, IED Agustín Parra, has an FM radio station on 97.7 MHz that is also available online. The (SHOUTcast) stream's URL is http://46.105.115.146:8286/

== Gallery ==
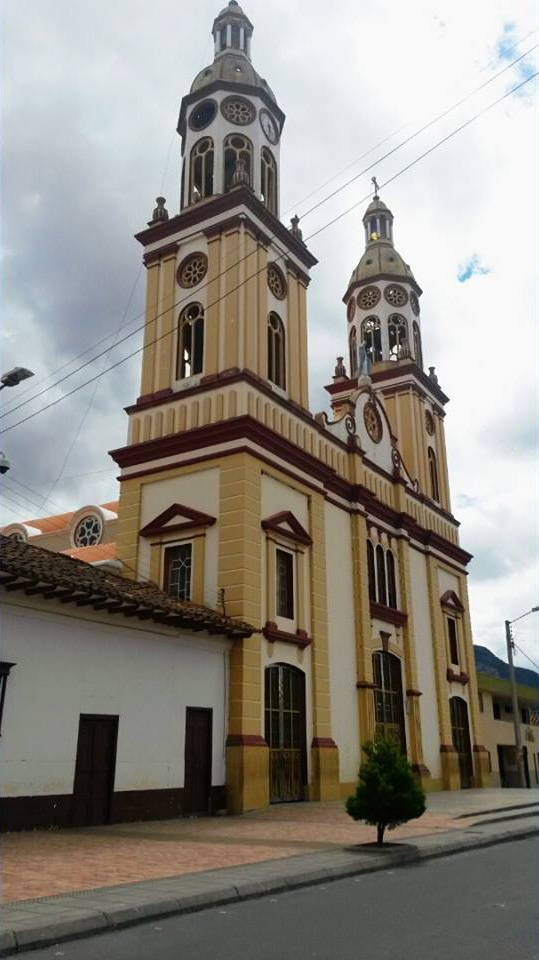
Church

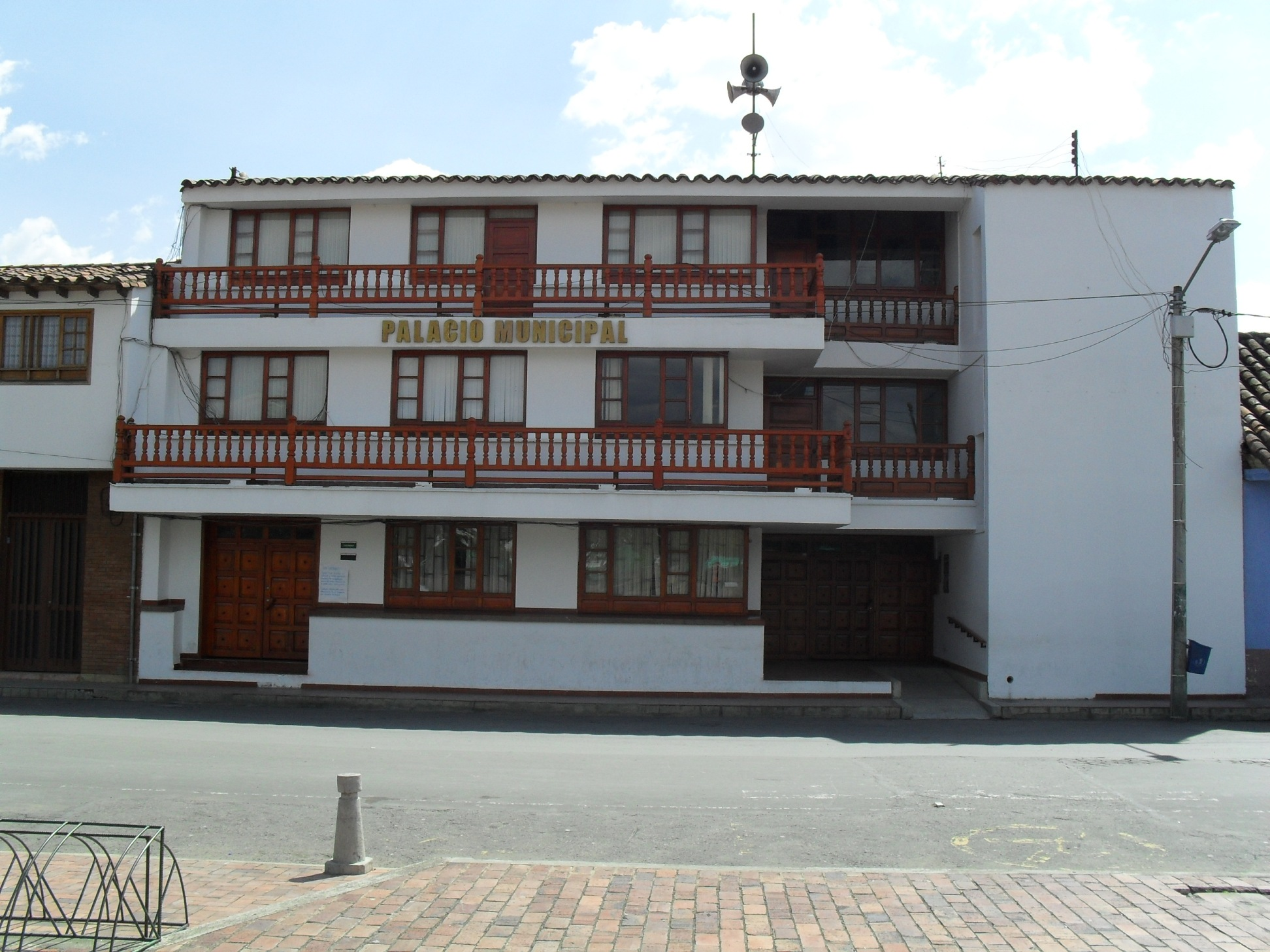
Council building

== Bibliography ==
- Espejo Olaya, Maria Bernarda (1999). Notas sobre toponimia en algunas coplas colombianas [Notes about toponomy of some Colombian ballads – Thesaurus] (PDF) (in Spanish). Vol. LIV. pp. 1102–1157.
- Restrepo Arcila, Roberto Arturo (2002). Sabiduría, poder y comprensión: América se repiensa desde sus orígenes [Wisdom, power and understanding: America thinks again about its origins] (in Spanish). Siglo del Hombre. pp. 1–199. ISBN 9789586650533.
