= Lenguazaque =

- Municipality and town
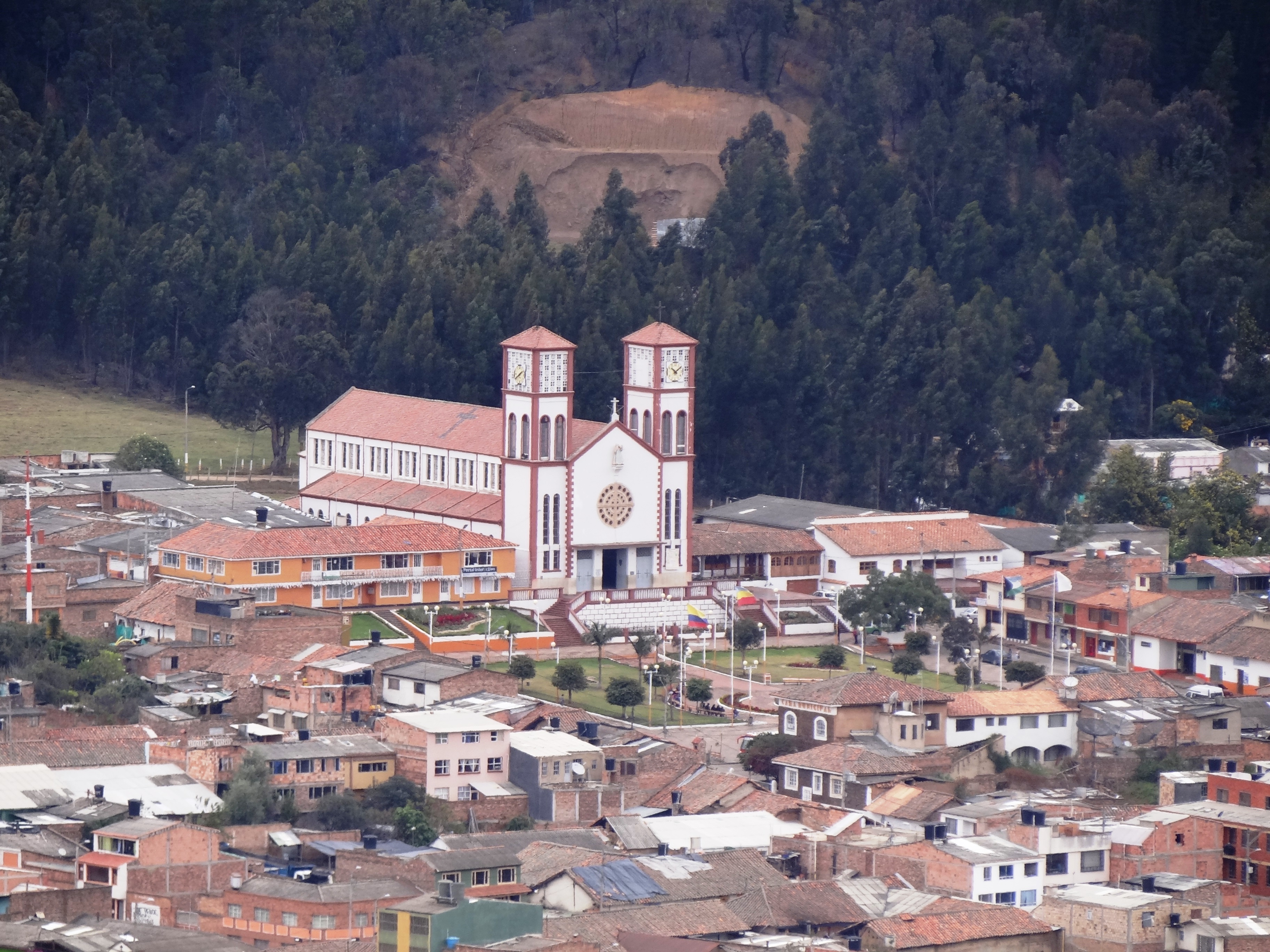

- Flag Seal

- Location of the municipality and town inside Cundinamarca Department of Colombia

- Location in Colombia
- Coordinates: 5°18′25″N 73°42′22″W
- Country: Colombia
- Department: Cundinamarca
- Province: Ubaté Province
- Founded: 13 March 1537
- Founder: Gonzalo Jiménez de Quesada

Government
  - Mayor: Camilo Andrés Lara Gómez (2016-2019)

Area
  - Municipality and town: 153.6 km^{2} (59.3 sq mi)
- Elevation: 2,589 m (8,494 ft)

Population (2015)
  - Municipality and town: 10,268
  - Density: 66.85/km^{2} (173.1/sq mi)
  - Urban: 2,282
- Time zone: UTC-5 (Colombia Standard Time)
- Website: Official website

Lenguazaque is a municipality and town of Colombia in the department of Cundinamarca. Lenguazaque is situated on the Altiplano Cundiboyacense, part of the Eastern Ranges of the Colombian Andes at a distance of 116 kilometres (72 mi) from the capital Bogotá. It borders Guachetá in the north, Ubaté in the west, Cucunubá in the south and Villapinzón in the east.

== History ==
In the time of the Muisca Confederation, before the Spanish conquest, Lenguazaque was ruled by the zaque of Hunza, currently known as Tunja, Boyacá. Modern Lenguazaque was founded by Spanish conquistador Gonzalo Jiménez de Quesada early on in his conquest of the central highlands of Colombia, on March 13, 1537.

Lenguazaque in the Chibcha language of the Muisca means "end of the reign of the zaque".

== Economy ==
The main economic activity in Lenguazaque is coal mining. Also agriculture is executed, predominantly potatoes and to a lesser extent peas, maize, barley and wheat.
