= Tausa =

- Municipality and town
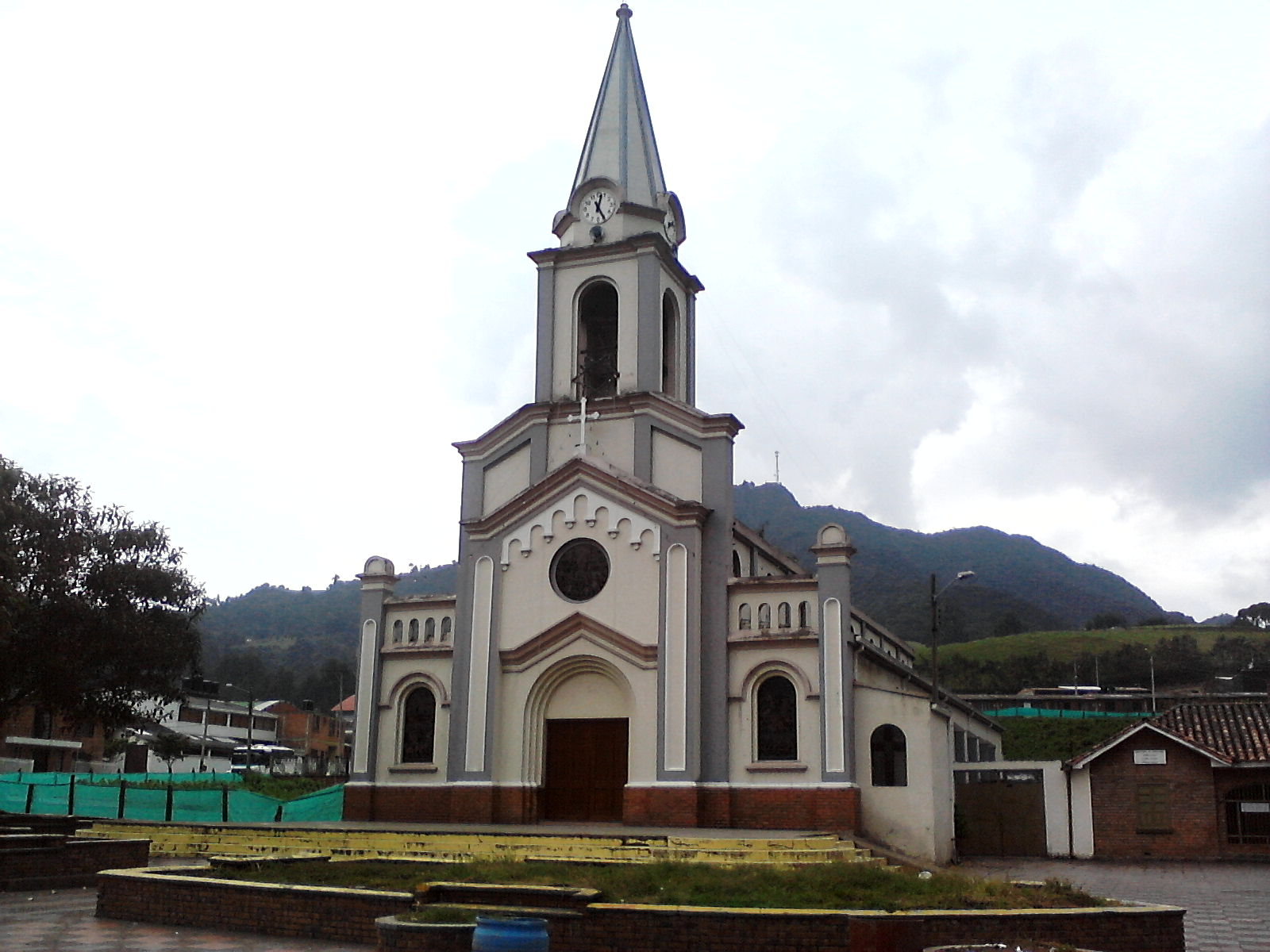
- Church of Tausa

- Flag Seal

- Location of the municipality and town inside Cundinamarca Department of Colombia

- Location in Colombia
- Coordinates: 5°11′47″N 73°53′15″W
- Country: Colombia
- Department: Cundinamarca
- Province: Ubaté Province
- Founded: 2 August 1600

Government
  - Mayor: Jaime Alexander Rodríguez Ballen (2016-2019)

Area
  - Municipality and town: 204 km^{2} (79 sq mi)
  - Urban: 2 km^{2} (0.77 sq mi)
- Elevation: 2,931 m (9,616 ft)

Population (2015)
  - Municipality and town: 8,801
  - Density: 43.1/km^{2} (112/sq mi)
  - Urban: 1,058
- Time zone: UTC-5 (Colombia Standard Time)
- Website: Official website

Tausa (Spanish pronunciation: [ˈtawsa]) is a municipality and town of Colombia in the Ubaté Province, part of the department of Cundinamarca. Tausa is and was an important town on the Altiplano Cundiboyacense due to its salt mine. It was the third most prolific salt deposit for the original inhabitants of the area; the Muisca. Tausa's urban centre is located at an elevation of 2,950 metres (9,680 ft) (other parts of the municipality reach elevations of 3,700 metres (12,100 ft)) and a distance of 65 kilometres (40 mi) from the capital Bogotá. The municipality borders San Cayetano, Carmen de Carupa and Sutatausa in the north, Pacho in the west, Sutatausa, Cucunubá and Suesca in the east and in the south with Nemocón and Cogua.

== Etymology ==
The name Tausa comes from Chibcha and means "tribute".

== History ==
Tausa was inhabited since the Herrera Period. The town was an important mining location of halite for the Muisca. The zipa of Bacatá ruled over Tausa. The mining activities can be seen in the seal of the village; the pick and spade.

Modern Tausa was founded on August 2, 1600.

== Economy ==
Main sources of income of Tausa are agriculture, livestock farming and salt mining.

== See also ==
- Muisca economy#Mining
- Nemocón
- Zipaquirá

== Bibliography ==
- Espejo Olaya, Maria Bernarda (1999). Notas sobre toponimia en algunas coplas colombianas [Notes about toponomy of some Colombian ballads - Thesaurus] (PDF) (in Spanish). Vol. Tomo LIV, Núm. 3. pp. 1102–1157.
