= Ubaté Province =

Ubaté Province Provincia de Ubaté
- Province
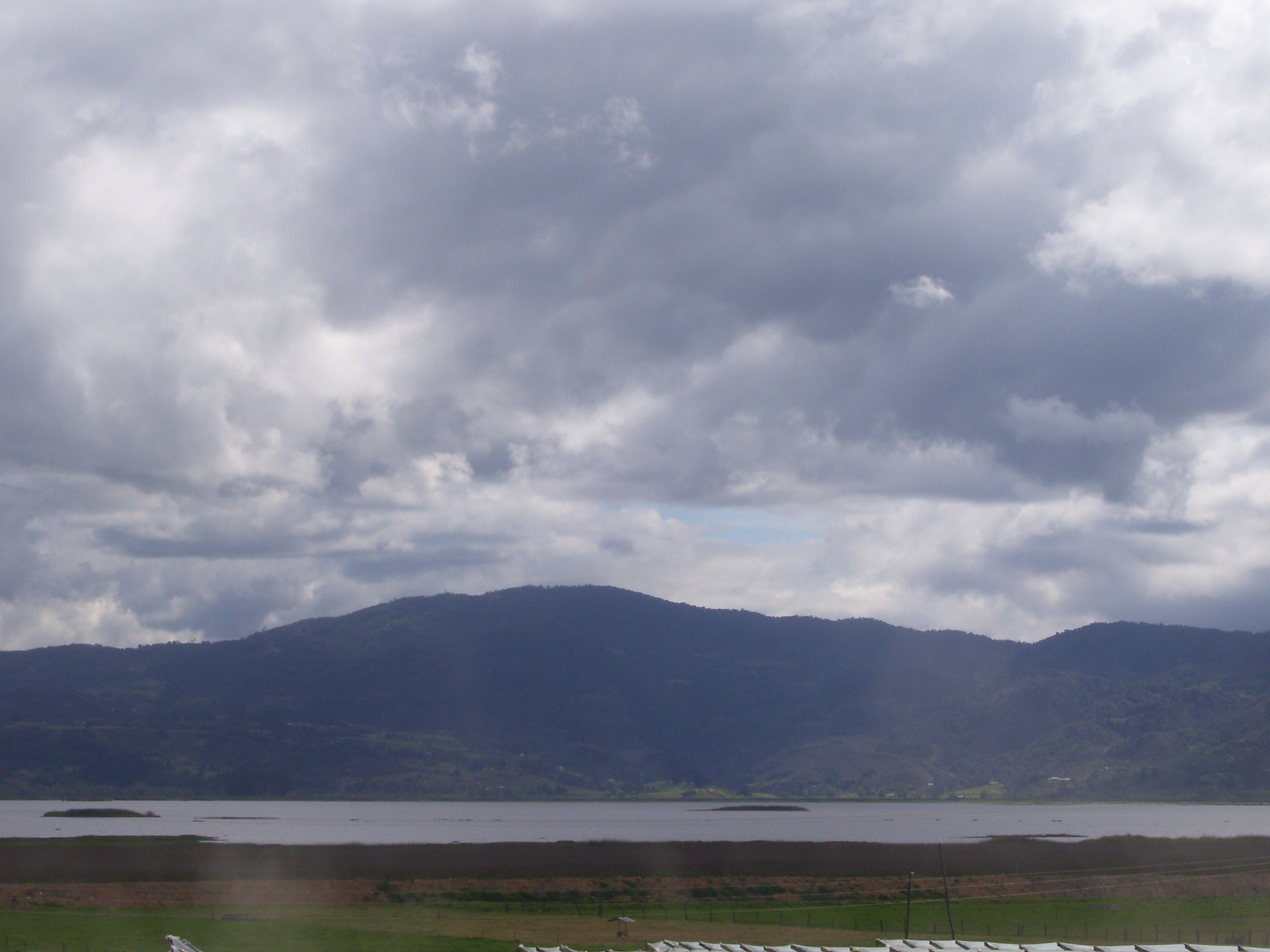
- Lake Fúquene
- Etymology: Ebate; "Bloodied land"
- Location of Ubaté Province in Colombia
- Coordinates: 5°18′26″N 73°48′52″W
- Country: Colombia
- Department: Cundinamarca
- Capital: Ubaté
- Municipalities: 10

Area
  - Total: 1,327.05 km^{2} (512.38 sq mi)

Population (2015)
  - Total: 122,411
  - Density: 92.2429/km^{2} (238.908/sq mi)
- Time zone: UTC−05:00 (COT)
- Indigenous groups: Muisca

Ubaté Province is one of the 15 provinces in the Cundinamarca Department, Colombia.

== Etymology ==
The name Ubaté comes from the native name "Ebate" meaning "Bloodied land" or "Sower of the mouth".

== Subdivision ==
The Ubaté Province is subdivided into 10 municipalities:

Municipality bold is capital	Area km^{2}	Elevation (m) urban centre	Population 2015	Founded	Map
Ubaté	102	2556	38,809	1592	
Carmen de Carupa	228	2600	9109	1808	
Cucunubá	112	2590	7479	1600	
Fúquene	90	2750	5617	1638	
Guachetá	177.45	2688	11,385	1537	
Lenguazaque	153.6	2589	10,268	1537	
Simijaca	107	2559	13,077	1600	
Susa	86	2655	12,302	1600	
Sutatausa	67	2550	5564	1537	
Tausa	204	2931	8801	1600	
Total	1327.05		122,411		
