= Sutatausa =

- Municipality and town
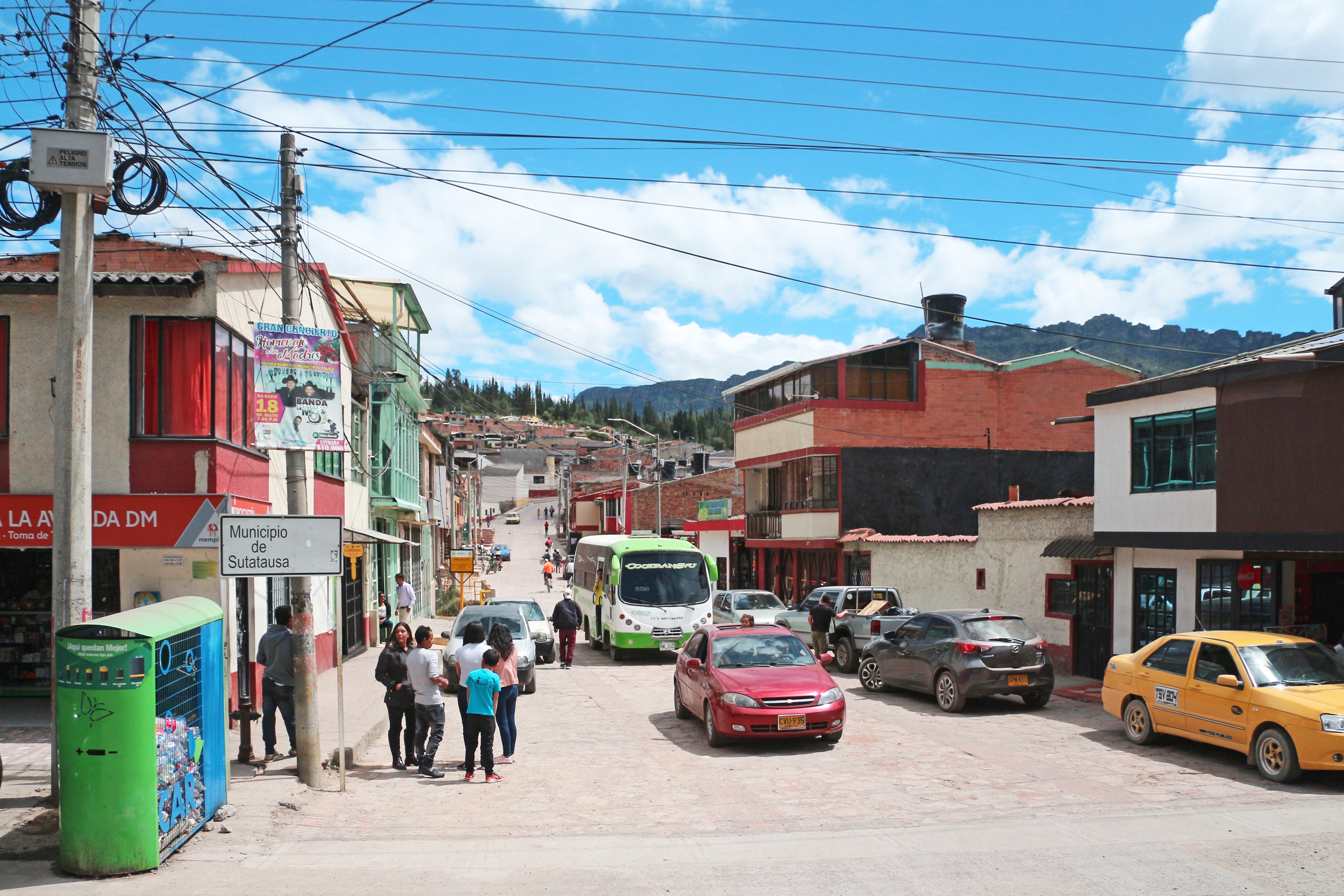
- Street in Sutatausa

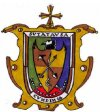
- Flag Coat of arms

- Location of the municipality and town inside Cundinamarca Department of Colombia

- Location in Colombia
- Coordinates: 5°14′50″N 73°51′9″W
- Country: Colombia
- Department: Cundinamarca
- Province: Ubaté Province
- Founded: 24 June 1537
- Founder: Hernán Pérez de Quesada

Government
  - Mayor: Hugo Orlando Santa Rodríguez (2016-2019)

Area
  - Municipality and town: 67 km^{2} (26 sq mi)
- Elevation: 2,550 m (8,370 ft)

Population (2015)
  - Municipality and town: 5,564
  - Density: 83/km^{2} (220/sq mi)
  - Urban: 1,743
- Time zone: UTC-5 (Colombia Standard Time)
- Website: Official website

Sutatausa (Spanish pronunciation: [sutaˈtawsa]) is a municipality and town of Colombia in the Ubaté Province, part of the department of Cundinamarca. The municipality is located on the Altiplano Cundiboyacense at a distance of 88 kilometres (55 mi) from the capital Bogotá and borders Ubaté in the north, Tausa in the south, Cucunubá in the east and Carmen de Carupa and Tausa in the west.

== Etymology ==
The name Sutatausa comes from Chibcha and means "small tribute".

== History ==
The area of Sutatause before the Spanish conquest was inhabited by the Muisca, organised in their loose Muisca Confederation. Sutatausa was ruled by the zipa based in Muyquytá.

Modern Sutatausa was founded on June 24 (Saint John's day), 1537 by Hernán Pérez de Quesada, brother of conquistador Gonzalo Jiménez de Quesada, who on the same day founded Tenza.

== Economy ==
Main economical activities of Sutatausa are agriculture, dairy farming and small-scale mining. Tourism is also an important factor of income.

== Climate ==
Climate data for Sutatausa, elevation 2,700 m (8,900 ft), (1981–2010)
| Month | Jan | Feb | Mar | Apr | May | Jun | Jul | Aug | Sep | Oct | Nov | Dec | Year |
|---|---|---|---|---|---|---|---|---|---|---|---|---|---|
| Mean daily maximum °C (°F) | 19.6 (67.3) | 19.2 (66.6) | 19.2 (66.6) | 18.9 (66.0) | 18.1 (64.6) | 17.5 (63.5) | 17.4 (63.3) | 17.9 (64.2) | 18.5 (65.3) | 19.2 (66.6) | 19.2 (66.6) | 19.3 (66.7) | 18.6 (65.5) |
| Daily mean °C (°F) | 13.5 (56.3) | 13.7 (56.7) | 13.8 (56.8) | 14.0 (57.2) | 13.8 (56.8) | 13.3 (55.9) | 13.3 (55.9) | 13.4 (56.1) | 13.6 (56.5) | 13.9 (57.0) | 13.7 (56.7) | 13.6 (56.5) | 13.6 (56.5) |
| Mean daily minimum °C (°F) | 8.6 (47.5) | 9.4 (48.9) | 9.5 (49.1) | 10.5 (50.9) | 10.6 (51.1) | 10.1 (50.2) | 10.3 (50.5) | 10.0 (50.0) | 9.9 (49.8) | 10.5 (50.9) | 10.2 (50.4) | 9.3 (48.7) | 9.8 (49.6) |
| Average precipitation mm (inches) | 29.5 (1.16) | 55.5 (2.19) | 85.2 (3.35) | 92.3 (3.63) | 72.1 (2.84) | 38.7 (1.52) | 29.6 (1.17) | 29.8 (1.17) | 54.2 (2.13) | 89.5 (3.52) | 71.5 (2.81) | 41.5 (1.63) | 689.4 (27.14) |
| Average precipitation days | 5 | 8 | 11 | 12 | 14 | 9 | 11 | 10 | 9 | 13 | 12 | 7 | 118 |
Source: Instituto de Hidrologia Meteorologia y Estudios Ambientales

== Gallery ==
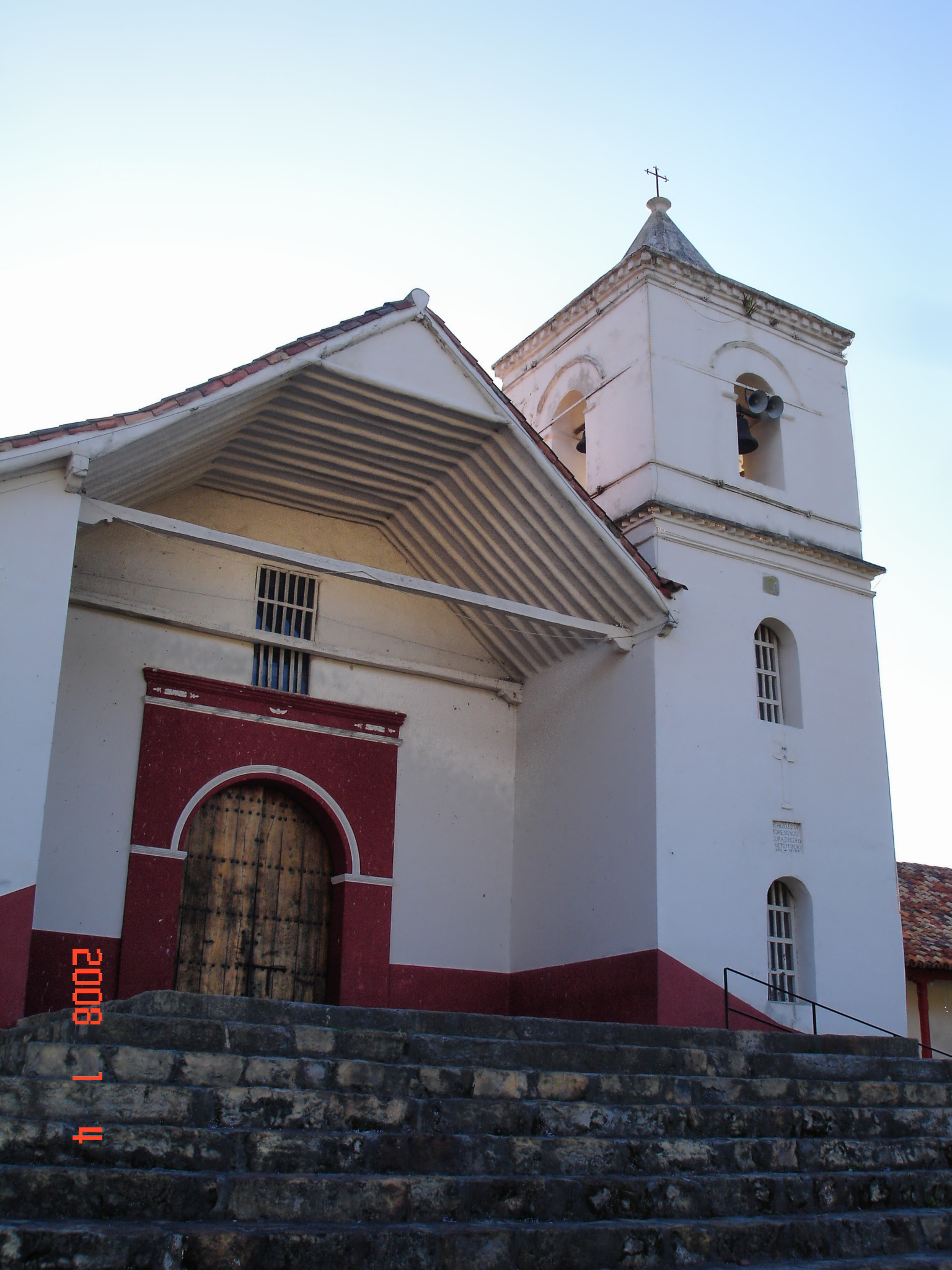
Church of Sutatausa

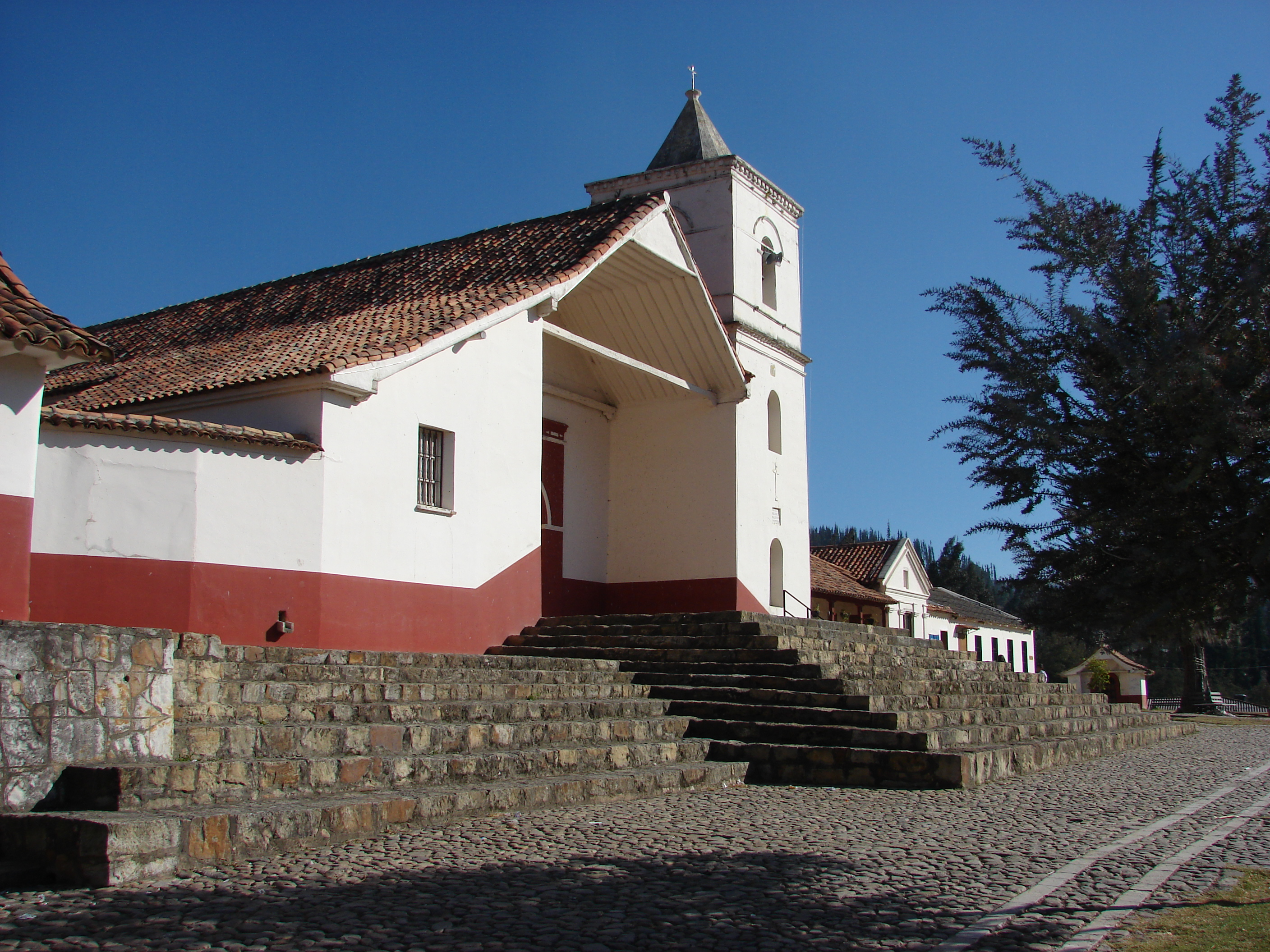
Church

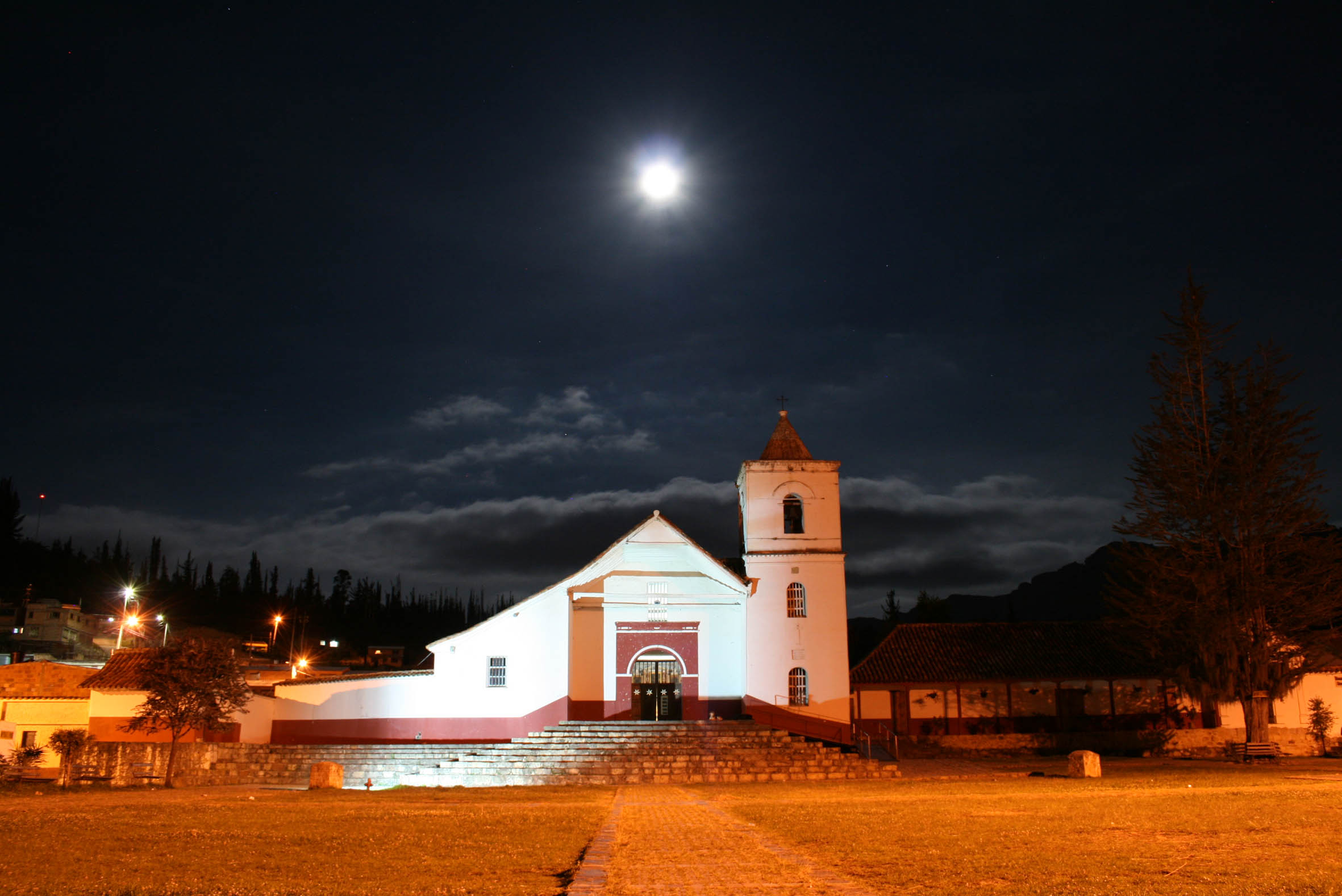
Church by night

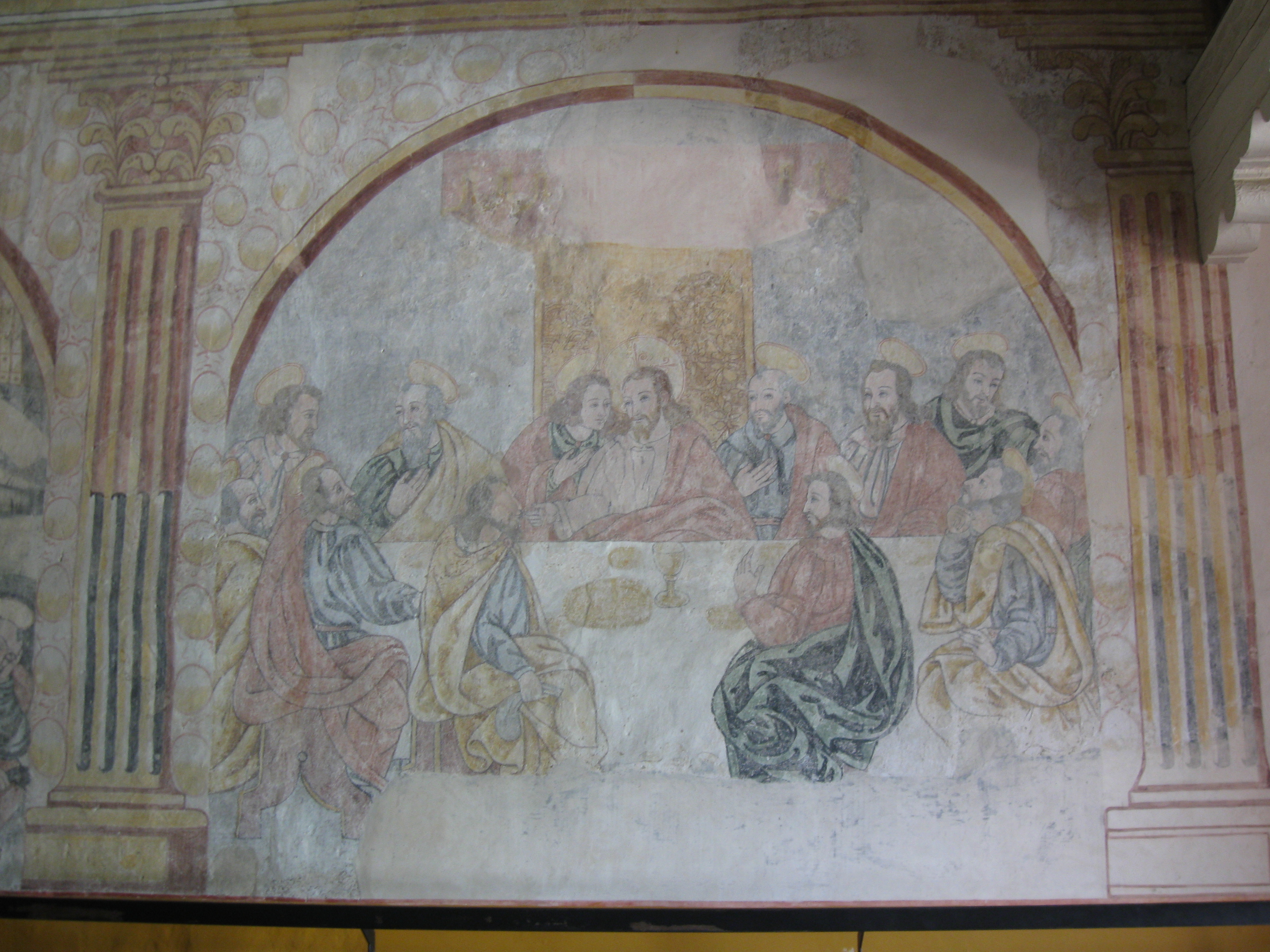
Church interior;
Last Supper

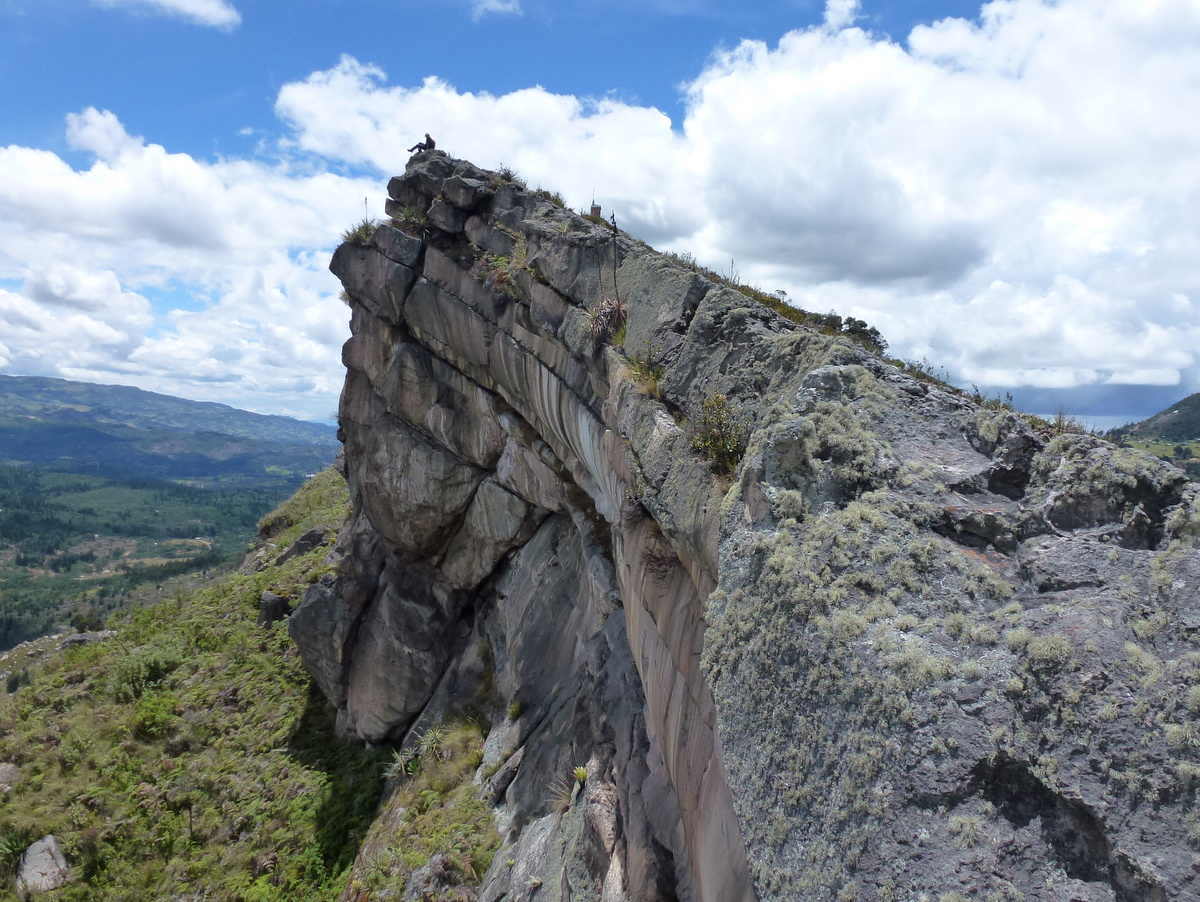
Rock outcrop in Sutatausa
