= Cogua =

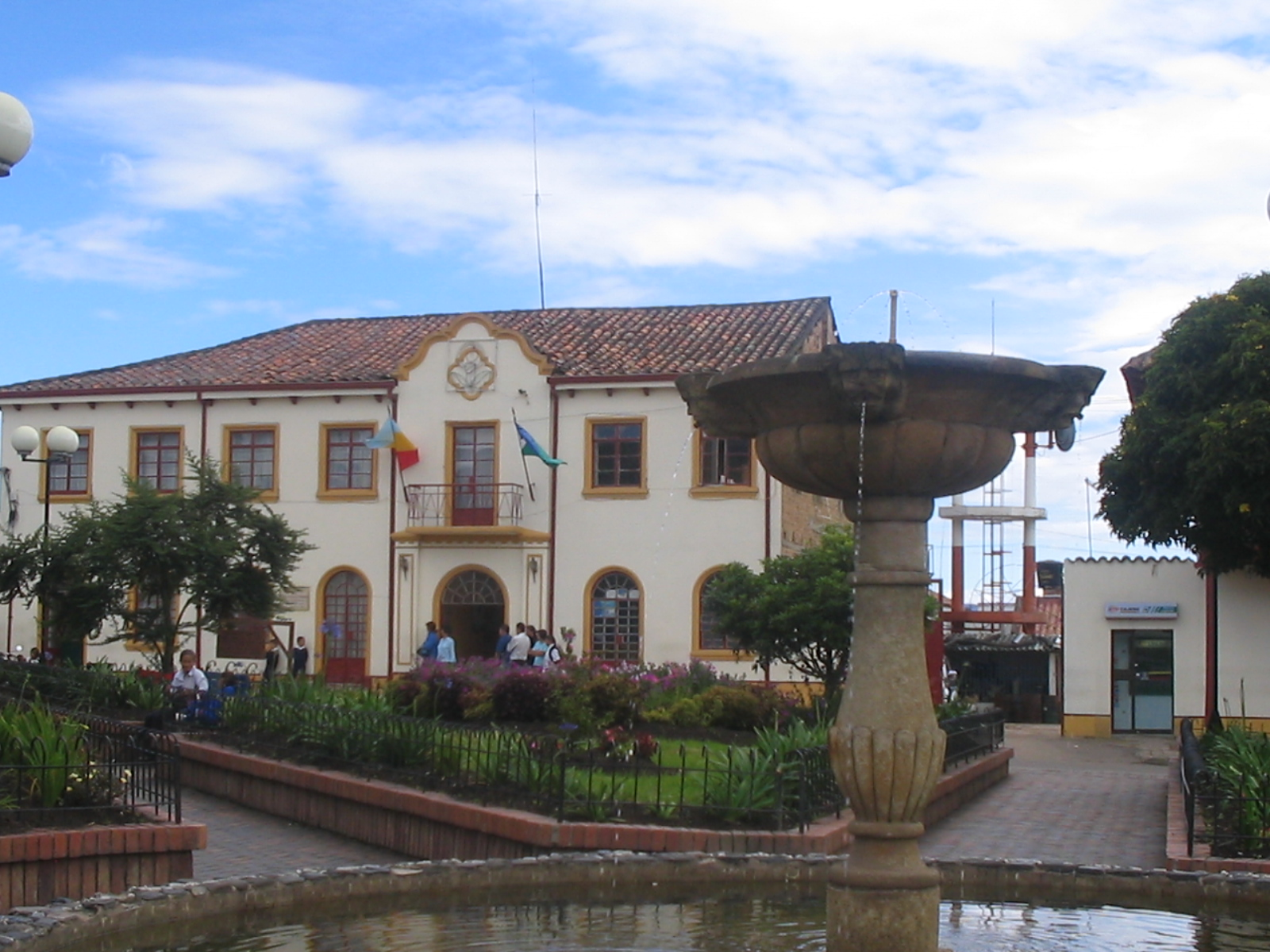
- Central square of Cogua

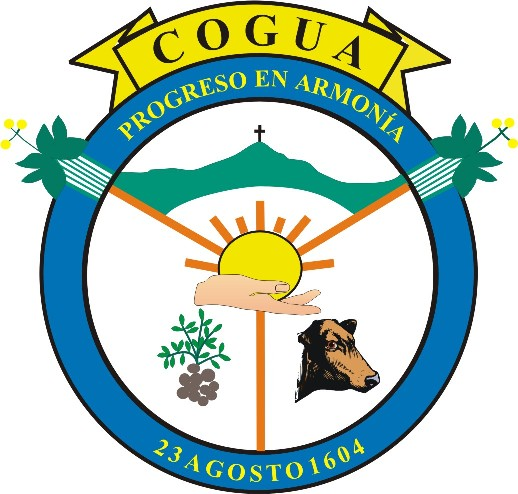
- Flag Seal
- Nickname: current city of pure water
- Location of the town and municipality of Cogua in the Cundinamarca Department.

- Location in Colombia
- Coordinates: 5°3′19″N 74°1′17″W
- Country: Colombia
- Departamento: Cundinamarca
- Province: Central Savanna Province
- Founded: 23 August 1604
- Founder: Lorenzo de Terrones

Government
  - Mayor: William Dario Forero Forero (2016-2019)

Area
  - City: 113 km^{2} (44 sq mi)
  - Urban: 14 km^{2} (5.4 sq mi)
- Elevation: 2,600 m (8,500 ft)

Population (2015)
  - City: 22,361
  - Density: 198/km^{2} (513/sq mi)
  - Urban: 7,736
- Demonym: Coguan
- Time zone: UTC-5
- Area code: 1
- Website: Official website

Cogua (Spanish pronunciation: [ˈkoɣwa]) is a municipality and town of Colombia in the department of Cundinamarca. It is situated on northern part of the Bogotá savanna with the urban centre at an altitude of 2,600 metres (8,500 ft) at 50 kilometres (31 mi) from the capital Bogotá. Cogua borders Tausa in the north, Nemocón in the east, Pacho in the west and Zipaquirá in the south.

== Etymology ==
The name Cogua is derived from Chibcha and means "Support of the hill".

== History ==
Cogua in the times before the Spanish conquest was inhabited by the Muisca who lived on the Altiplano Cundiboyacense and had established an advanced civilization. Cogua is located between two important sources of salt in the Muisca economy; Zipaquirá and Nemocón.

Modern Cogua was founded on August 23, 1604 by Lorenzo de Terrones.

== Economy ==
Main economical activities of Cogua are agriculture and livestock farming. The Neusa Reservoir is located within the boundaries of Cogua.

== Gallery ==
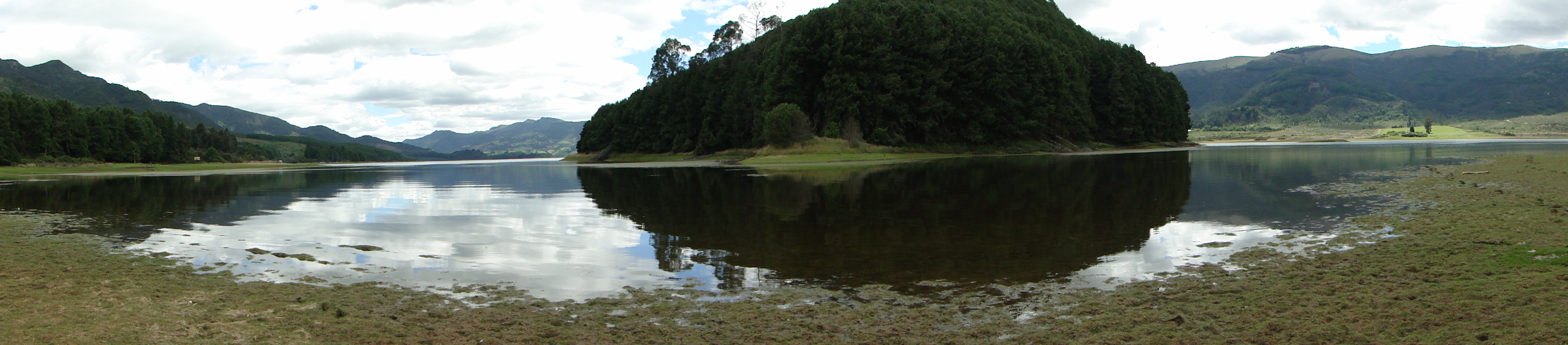
Panorama of the Neusa Reservoir, Cogua
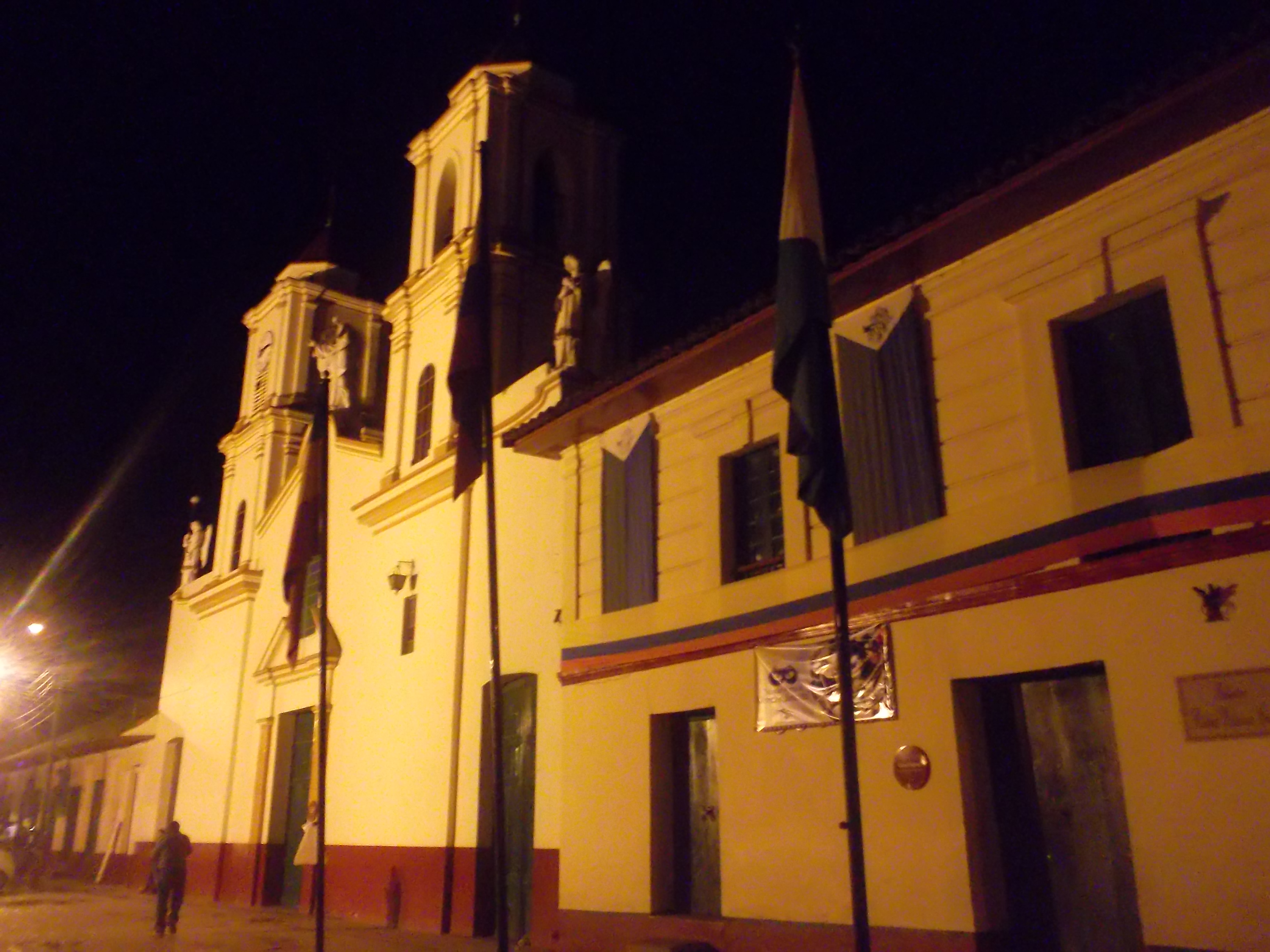
Church of Cogua
