= Cucunubá =

- Municipality and town
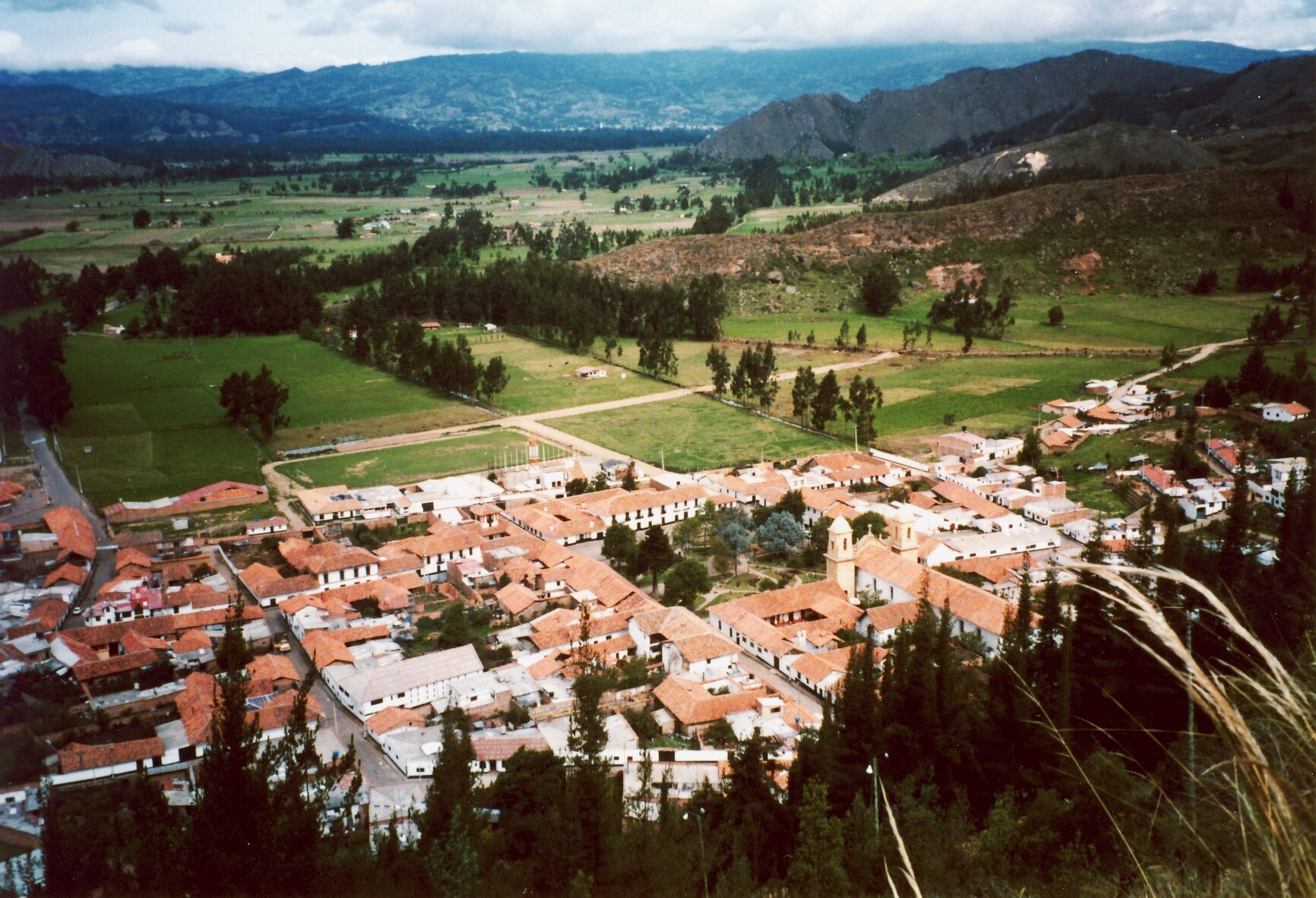
- View of Cucunubá

- Flag Coat of arms

- Location of the municipality and town inside Cundinamarca Department of Colombia

- Location in Colombia
- Coordinates: 5°15′0″N 73°45′48″W
- Country: Colombia
- Department: Cundinamarca
- Province: Ubaté Province
- Founded: 2 August 1600
- Founder: Luis Enríquez

Government
  - Mayor: Sandra Liliana Jara Alonso (2016-2019)

Area
  - Municipality and town: 112 km^{2} (43 sq mi)
  - Urban: 1.12 km^{2} (0.43 sq mi)
- Elevation: 2,590 m (8,500 ft)

Population (2015)
  - Municipality and town: 7,479
  - Density: 66.8/km^{2} (173/sq mi)
  - Urban: 1,383
- Time zone: UTC-5 (Colombia Standard Time)
- Website: Official website

Cucunubá is a municipality and town of Colombia in the Ubaté Province, part of the department of Cundinamarca. It borders with the municipalities of Ubaté, Lenguazaque, Suesca, Chocontá, Tausa and Sutatausa.

== Geography ==
The urban centre of the municipality is located in the Ubaté Valley at an altitude of 2,590 metres (8,500 ft), while other parts stretch over the mountainous sectors of the Eastern Ranges of the Colombian Andes. The urban centre is at a distance of 90 kilometres (56 mi) from the capital Bogotá.

== Etymology ==
The name Cucunubá comes from Chibcha and means "Similarity to a face".

== History ==
Cucunubá in the times before the Spanish conquest was part of the Muisca Confederation, a loose confederation of rulers of the Muisca.

Modern Cucunubá was founded on August 2, 1600, by Luis Enríquez.

== Economy ==
Main economical activity of Cucunubá is carbon mining. More than half of the municipality's area is covered with farmfields and livestock farming producers. Main agricultural products are potatoes, peas and wheat.

== Gallery ==
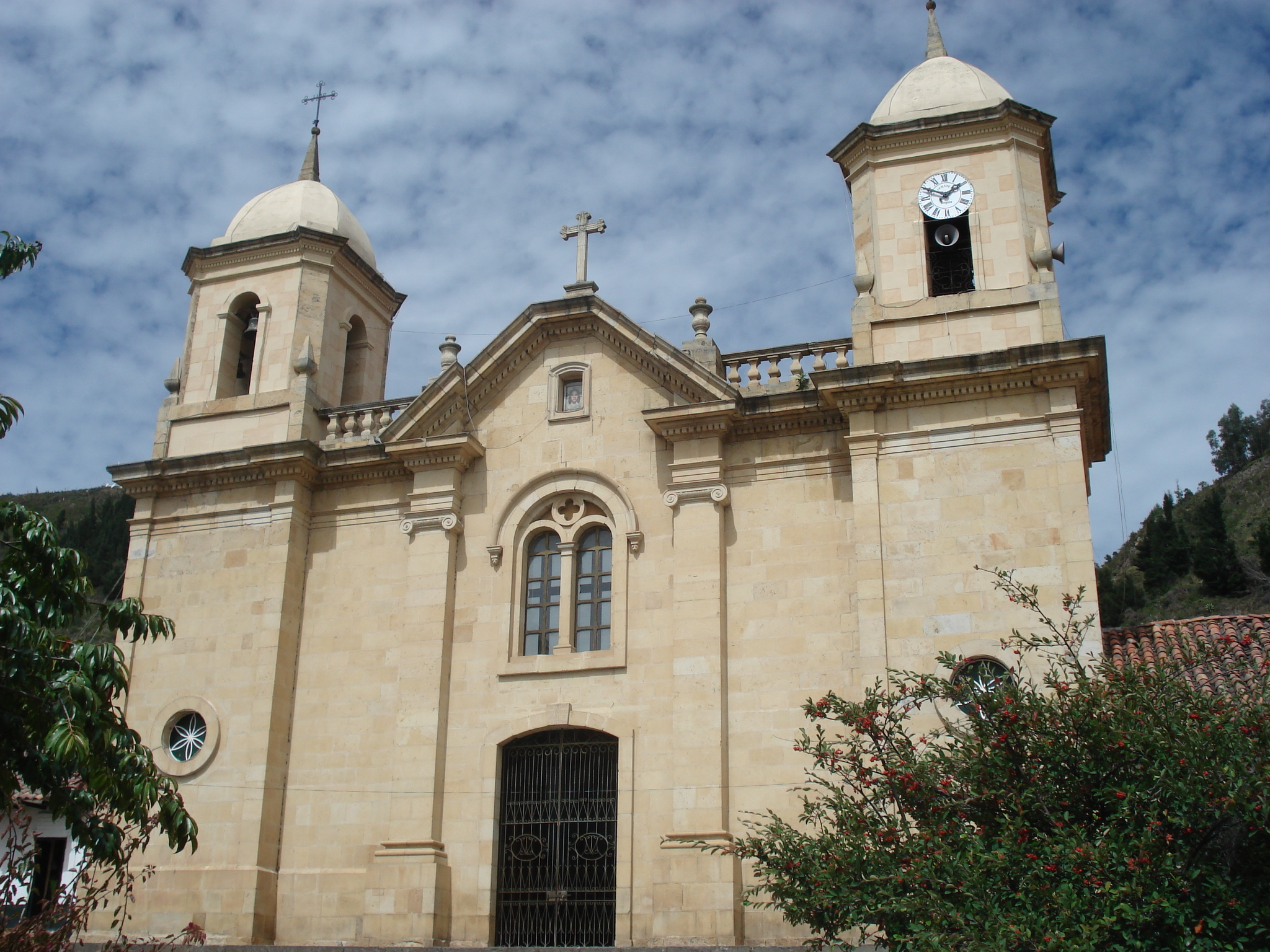
Church of Cucunubá

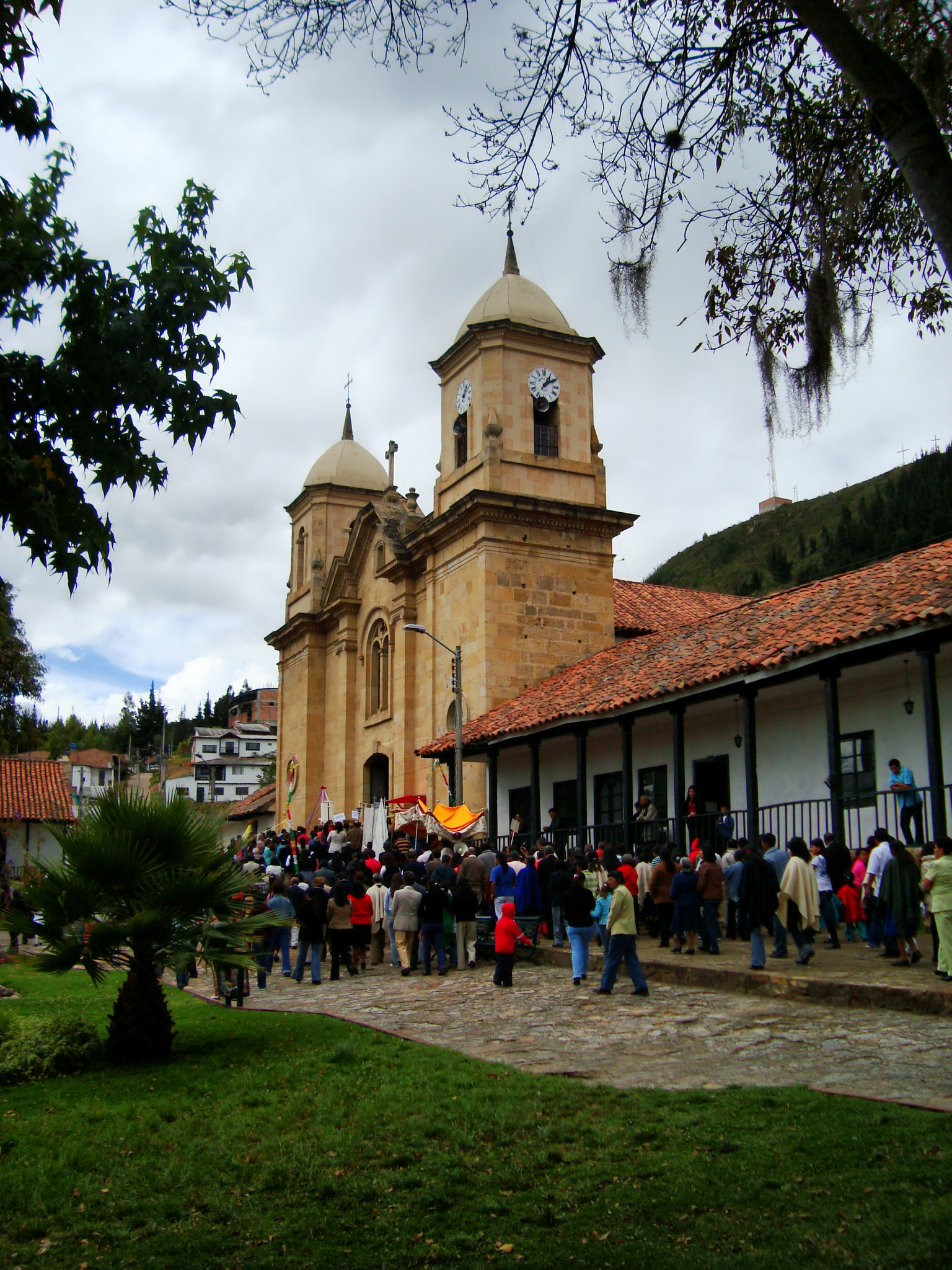
Church
