= Fúquene =

- Municipality and town
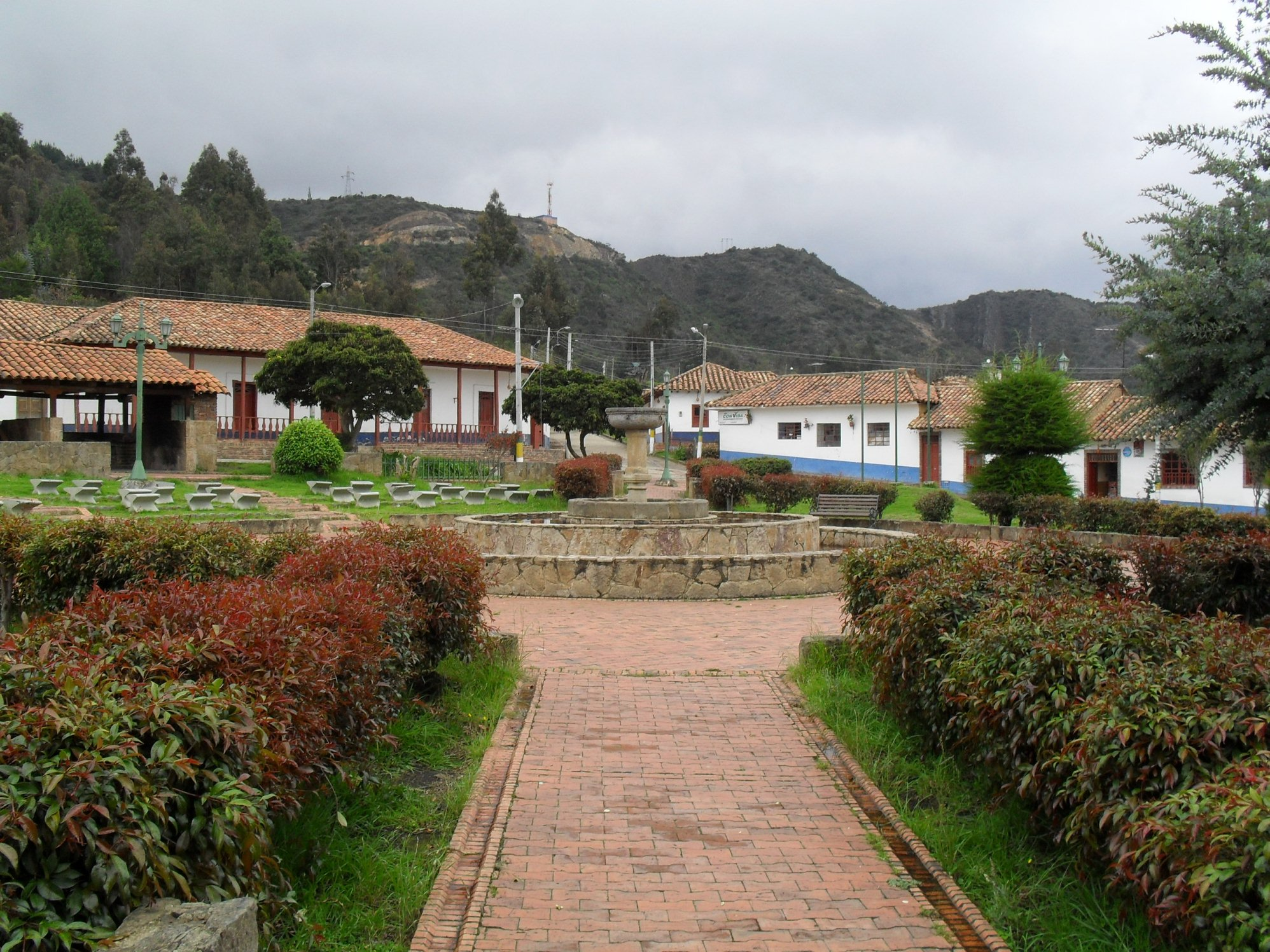
- Park in Fúquene

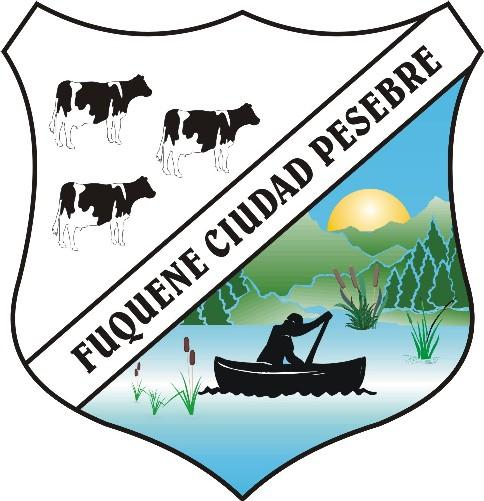
- Flag Coat of arms

- Location of the municipality and town inside Cundinamarca Department of Colombia

- Location in Colombia
- Coordinates: 5°24′18″N 73°47′45″W
- Country: Colombia
- Department: Cundinamarca
- Province: Ubaté Province
- Founded: 6 November 1638
- Founder: Gabriel Carvajal

Government
  - Mayor: Oscar Fredy Rojas Briceño (2016-2019)

Area
  - Municipality and town: 90 km^{2} (35 sq mi)
- Elevation: 2,750 m (9,020 ft)

Population (2015)
  - Municipality and town: 5,617
  - Density: 62/km^{2} (160/sq mi)
  - Urban: 263
- Time zone: UTC-5 (Colombia Standard Time)
- Website: Official website

Fúquene is a municipality and town of Colombia in the department of Cundinamarca. The municipality borders Ubaté, Susa, Guachetá and the department of Boyacá. Fúquene is located 116 km northwest from the capital Bogotá.

== History ==
Fúquene, in the north of the present department of Cundinamarca, was in the centuries before the Spanish conquest inhabited by the Muisca. The village was located in the border region of the northern Muisca territories, ruled by the zaque of Hunza, the southern Muisca area with the zipa based in Bacatá and the independent territories in the northwest. A lake within the boundaries of Fúquene, Lake Fúquene was considered a sacred site in the religion of the Muisca.

With the arrival of the Spanish conquistadores many indigenous people fled to an island in Lake Fúquene. Modern Fúquene was first established by one of the few female founders in 1542, Teresa de Verdugo. The town was properly founded on November 6, 1638, by Gabriel Carvajal.

== Etymology ==
The name Fúquene is either derived from the Chibcha words fú and quyny, meaning "bed of the fox", or named after the god Fu, who inhabited the lake defending the terrain against the Muzo; "bed of Fu".

== Economy ==
Main economical activities of Fúquene are livestock farming and agriculture, mainly potatoes, tomatoes, maize and fruits as strawberries.

== Climate ==
Climate data for Fúquene (Isla del Santuario), elevation 2,580 m (8,460 ft), (1981–2010)
Month	Jan	Feb	Mar	Apr	May	Jun	Jul	Aug	Sep	Oct	Nov	Dec	Year
Mean daily maximum °C (°F)	22.7 (72.9)	22.8 (73.0)	22.4 (72.3)	21.3 (70.3)	20.6 (69.1)	20.0 (68.0)	19.9 (67.8)	20.2 (68.4)	21.0 (69.8)	21.2 (70.2)	21.2 (70.2)	21.8 (71.2)	21.3 (70.3)
Daily mean °C (°F)	14.6 (58.3)	14.8 (58.6)	14.8 (58.6)	14.7 (58.5)	14.7 (58.5)	14.4 (57.9)	14.0 (57.2)	14.1 (57.4)	14.2 (57.6)	14.2 (57.6)	14.4 (57.9)	14.5 (58.1)	14.5 (58.1)
Mean daily minimum °C (°F)	8.6 (47.5)	9.1 (48.4)	9.6 (49.3)	10.3 (50.5)	10.3 (50.5)	9.9 (49.8)	9.4 (48.9)	9.3 (48.7)	9.1 (48.4)	9.5 (49.1)	9.9 (49.8)	9.1 (48.4)	9.5 (49.1)
Average precipitation mm (inches)	51.7 (2.04)	63.2 (2.49)	124.6 (4.91)	151.7 (5.97)	116.9 (4.60)	42.7 (1.68)	46.5 (1.83)	40.0 (1.57)	78.8 (3.10)	163.4 (6.43)	142.7 (5.62)	85.5 (3.37)	1,107.6 (43.61)
Average precipitation days	10	11	15	19	18	12	12	11	13	18	19	13	167
Average relative humidity (%)	77	77	79	82	81	82	80	80	80	83	84	81	81
Mean monthly sunshine hours	229.4	189.1	173.6	135.0	136.4	144.0	167.4	164.3	153.0	151.9	159.0	201.5	2,004.6
Mean daily sunshine hours	7.4	6.7	5.6	4.5	4.4	4.8	5.4	5.3	5.1	4.9	5.3	6.5	5.5
Source: Instituto de Hidrologia Meteorologia y Estudios Ambientales
