= Susa, Cundinamarca =

Susa
- Municipality and town
- Flag Coat of arms
- Etymology: Muysccubun: "white or soft reed"
- Location of the municipality and town inside Cundinamarca Department of Colombia

- Location in Colombia
- Coordinates: 5°27′10.1″N 73°48′50.3″W
- Country: Colombia
- Department: Cundinamarca
- Province: Ubaté Province
- Founded: 21 February 1600
- Founder: Luís Enríquez

Government
  - Mayor: Oscar Eduardo Rocha Ramírez (2016-2019)

Area
  - Municipality and town: 86 km^{2} (33 sq mi)
  - Urban: 1.2 km^{2} (0.46 sq mi)
- Elevation: 2,655 m (8,711 ft)

Population (2015)
  - Municipality and town: 12,302
  - Density: 140/km^{2} (370/sq mi)
  - Urban: 6,315
- Time zone: UTC-5 (Colombia Standard Time)
- Website: Official website

Susa is a town and municipality in the Ubaté Province, part of the Cundinamarca Department, Colombia. The town centre is located at an altitude of 2,655 metres (8,711 ft) on the Altiplano Cundiboyacense at 130 kilometres (81 mi) from the capital Bogotá. Susa borders Simijaca, Fúquene, San Miguel de Sema and Lake Fúquene.

== Etymology ==
In the Chibcha language of the Muisca, susa means "white reed" or "soft reed".

== History ==
The area of Susa before the Spanish conquest was part of the Muisca Confederation. Initially loyal to the zaque of Hunza, Susa changed rule around 1490 when it was submitted by zipa Saguamanchica.

In pre-Columbian times, the territory of the current municipality of Susa was inhabited by the Muiscas. Around 1537, the passage of Gonzalo Jiménez de Quesada through the territory of Susa to the south was recorded.14 On August 2, 1600, the Oidor Luis Enríquez issued from Cucunubá the order of founding of the new Indian towns of Susa, Simijaca, Fúquene and Nemoquá. On the same August 2, Luis Enríquez contracted with the bricklayer Juan Gómez de Grajeda the construction of the church of Susa for a value of 1,620 twenty-karat gold pesos; the deed was signed before the notary public Rodrigo Zapata and the witnesses and guarantors Juan Francisco de Ortega, Juan de Silva Collante, Domingo de Guevara and Juan de Vera.

On August 7, 1601, Juan Gómez de Grajeda stated that he was also in charge of building the Simijaca and Cucunubá churches, and that to build them he transferred his contract to Juan Gómez de Narváez. On April 29, 1603, there were 303 tributaries.

On July 29, 1604, the Oidor Lorencio de Terrones, with the clerk Rodrigo Zapata, made a description or list of visits and registration, which included 1,132 Indians. On December 9, 1638, on the visit of Gabriel de Carvajal, 1,461 Indians were related.

The chirimía was the group of Indian singers and musicians who accompanied the religious ceremonies, who enjoyed some privileges, including not paying tribute. In 1638 many Indian sheep orcars were related. The first baptism certificate that appears in the parish books dates from June 27, 1619, corresponding to Juan, 4 months old, son of Alonso Furistaguda and Doña Francisca his wife, signed by the priest Bartolomé Díaz Ortega.

On the altar of the parish church the image of the Virgen de los Dolores del Topo, patron saint of Susa, is venerated. The main altar is of Neo-Granada Baroque style, this altar is composed of a series of Corinthian columns with profusely decorated and gilded shafts, another artistic feature of this church is the tabernacle that has phytomorphic decorations on the outside and inside there are zoomorphic paintings and of vines, emulating the biblical paradise.

The name of Susa was also present in the liberation feat: on August 8, 1819, one day after the Battle of Boyacá, the lieutenant colonel of the Spanish army, Sebastián Díaz, refers: "At 10 o'clock you enter Chiquinquirá and after Two hours of rationing and rest, he leaves for Santa Fé, passing through Simijaca at two o'clock and arriving at Susa at three, where there is news that patriotic forces are advancing from Ubaté, which cannot be faced due to fatigue. At 7 o'clock in the night it turns towards Muzo ... ". 15 It is from this municipality that the Spaniards give up reaching Santa Fé and begin their definitive withdrawal, thus consolidating the independence victory.

In 1863 Felipe Pérez presented the "Physical and political Jeography of the State of Cundinamarca", one of the compilation documents of the Chorographic Commission from 1850 to 1859 (directed by Agustín Codazzi) and from 1860 to 1862, in which the municipality of as follows: "Susa, on the road to Chiquinquirá near Lake Fúquene. It has in its vicinity a very beautiful rock crystal mine, and in the time of the Indians it was a large, populated and rich city. Nemequene cipa. Inhabitants 3,754; meters above sea level 2,567.4; temperature 13º "

Another brief description of the surroundings of the town can be found in the "Impressions of a trip to America" by the Spanish José María Gutiérrez de Alba, who in one of his trips recounted his arrival on February 12, 1872:

"At half past three we arrived at the small town of Susa, located in a long and narrow inlet on the same plain, and to reach which we crossed an extensive avenue of willows, which give shade and comfort to the road. in its smallest details, the accidents of the branch of the mountain range indicated above, where formidable recesses, very sharp ridges and frightening depths can be seen, among which the one that bears the name of the Salto de Olalla is distinguished, a horrible cliff where the Indians threw the intrepid conqueror Antón de Olalla, who, stopped in his fall by some bushes, only suffered a broken leg. Since then they called him the Lame Man. "16

On August 20, 1991, a fire destroyed the town's Municipal House, where the town's archive was located, thus losing most of the town's nearly 400 years of documentary history. The church was saved from the conflagration.

By Decree 746 of April 24, 1996, the declaration of National Monument of the set of Passenger Railroad Stations in Colombia is made, sheltering said declaration to the Susa railway station (located at kilometer 140 of the Bogotá- Barbosa).It is currently listed in the list of Assets of Cultural Interest made by the Ministry of Culture, under the classification of Material Heritage - Real Estate

On February 20, 2022, the mayor of Susa was revoked in a recall referendum.

== Economy ==
The main economical activity in Simijaca is agriculture, with maize, potatoes, tomatoes and strawberries as the most important agricultural products.

== Bibliography ==
- Restrepo Arcila, Roberto Arturo (2002), Sabiduría, poder y comprensión: América se repiensa desde sus orígenes - Wisdom, power and understanding: America thinks again about its origins (in Spanish), Siglo del Hombre, pp. 1–199, ISBN 9789586650533
