= San Cayetano, Cundinamarca =

San Cayetano
- Municipality and town
- Flag Coat of arms

- Location of the municipality and town inside Cundinamarca Department of Colombia

- Location in Colombia
- Coordinates: 5°19′56″N 74°1′32″W
- Country: Colombia
- Department: Cundinamarca
- Time zone: UTC-5 (Colombia Standard Time)

San Cayetano is a municipality and town of Colombia in the department of Cundinamarca.

== Climate ==
Climate data for San Cayetano, elevation 2,150 m (7,050 ft), (1981–2010)
Month	Jan	Feb	Mar	Apr	May	Jun	Jul	Aug	Sep	Oct	Nov	Dec	Year
Mean daily maximum °C (°F)	20.4 (68.7)	20.6 (69.1)	20.4 (68.7)	20.3 (68.5)	20.3 (68.5)	20.7 (69.3)	20.8 (69.4)	21.2 (70.2)	21.1 (70.0)	20.5 (68.9)	20.5 (68.9)	20.6 (69.1)	20.6 (69.1)
Daily mean °C (°F)	15.8 (60.4)	15.9 (60.6)	16.0 (60.8)	16.2 (61.2)	16.3 (61.3)	16.4 (61.5)	16.2 (61.2)	16.3 (61.3)	16.3 (61.3)	16.1 (61.0)	16.1 (61.0)	16.0 (60.8)	16.1 (61.0)
Mean daily minimum °C (°F)	11.3 (52.3)	11.6 (52.9)	11.7 (53.1)	12.2 (54.0)	12.4 (54.3)	12.2 (54.0)	11.8 (53.2)	11.6 (52.9)	11.7 (53.1)	11.8 (53.2)	11.7 (53.1)	11.1 (52.0)	11.7 (53.1)
Average precipitation mm (inches)	117.4 (4.62)	137.9 (5.43)	160.6 (6.32)	192.7 (7.59)	152.2 (5.99)	41.9 (1.65)	38.1 (1.50)	38.3 (1.51)	96.5 (3.80)	219.6 (8.65)	199.9 (7.87)	152.8 (6.02)	1,548 (60.9)
Average precipitation days	14	14	19	20	19	11	10	10	13	21	21	16	188
Average relative humidity (%)	85	86	87	87	87	85	84	83	84	87	88	86	86
Mean monthly sunshine hours	164.3	129.9	111.6	93.0	105.4	132.0	148.8	142.6	123.0	120.9	123.0	161.2	1,555.7
Mean daily sunshine hours	5.3	4.6	3.6	3.1	3.4	4.4	4.8	4.6	4.1	3.9	4.1	5.2	4.3
Source: Instituto de Hidrologia Meteorologia y Estudios Ambientales
