= Ubaté =

- Municipality and town
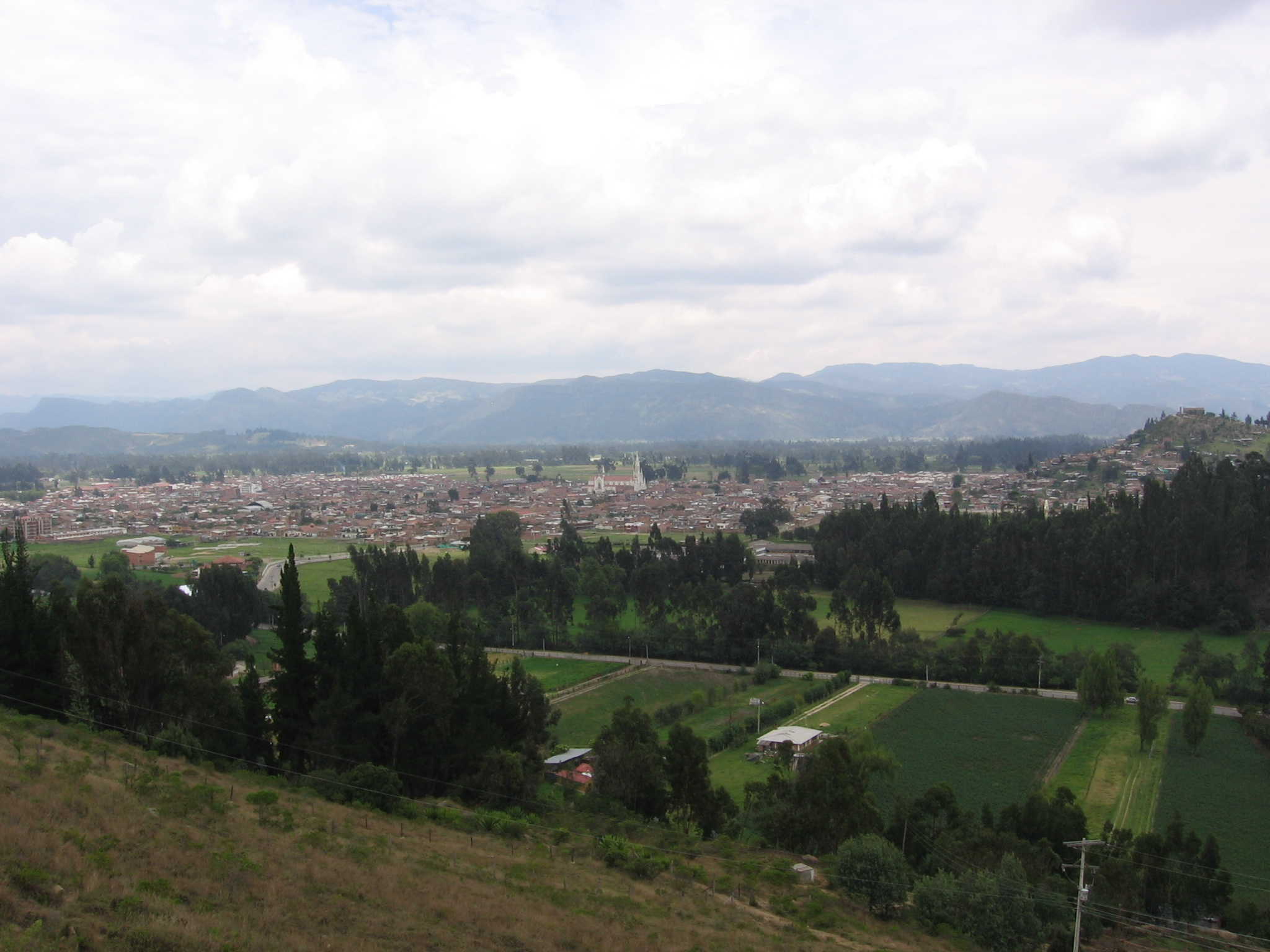
- View of Ubaté

- Flag Coat of arms

- Location of the municipality and town inside Cundinamarca Department of Colombia

- Location in Colombia
- Coordinates: 5°18′26″N 73°48′52″W
- Country: Colombia
- Department: Cundinamarca
- Province: Ubaté Province
- Founded: 12 April 1592
- Founder: Bernardo de Albornoz

Government
  - Mayor: Edgar Jairo Marquez Carrillo (2016-2019)

Area
  - Municipality and town: 102.3 km^{2} (39.5 sq mi)
  - Urban: 4 km^{2} (1.5 sq mi)
- Elevation: 2,556 m (8,386 ft)

Population (2018 census)
  - Municipality and town: 42,558
  - Density: 416.0/km^{2} (1,077/sq mi)
  - Urban: 31,042
  - Urban density: 7,800/km^{2} (20,000/sq mi)
- Time zone: UTC-5 (Colombia Standard Time)
- Website: Official website

Ubaté (originally Villa San Diego de Ubaté) is a town and municipality in the Ubaté Province, part of Cundinamarca Department, Colombia. Ubaté is the capital of the province with the same name and situated in the Ubaté–Chiquinquirá Valley of the Altiplano Cundiboyacense. The urban centre is located at an altitude of 2,556 metres (8,386 ft) and 97 kilometres (60 mi) from the capital Bogotá. The province borders the department of Boyacá in the north, the Rionegro Province in the west, the Central Savanna Province in the south and in the east and southeast the Almeidas Province.

== Etymology ==
The name Ubaté comes from the native name "Ebate" meaning "Bloodied land" or "Sower of the mouth".

== History ==
The area of Ubaté before the Spanish conquest was inhabited by the Muisca, organised in a loose confederation of rulers called the Muisca Confederation. Initially loyal to the zaque of Hunza, Ubaté changed rule around 1490 when it was submitted by zipa Saguamanchica.

Modern Ubaté was founded on April 12, 1592, by Bernardo de Albornoz.

It is known as the "Milk Capital of Colombia", for a Gothic style cathedral and the San Luis Convent.

== Economy ==
The main activities of Ubaté are agriculture and livestock farming.

== Climate ==
Climate data for Ubaté (Novilleros), elevation 2,550 m (8,370 ft), (1971–2000)
Month	Jan	Feb	Mar	Apr	May	Jun	Jul	Aug	Sep	Oct	Nov	Dec	Year
Mean daily maximum °C (°F)	20.4 (68.7)	20.4 (68.7)	19.8 (67.6)	19.5 (67.1)	19.0 (66.2)	17.9 (64.2)	17.7 (63.9)	18.1 (64.6)	18.7 (65.7)	19.3 (66.7)	19.6 (67.3)	19.8 (67.6)	19.2 (66.6)
Daily mean °C (°F)	12.0 (53.6)	12.4 (54.3)	13.0 (55.4)	12.9 (55.2)	12.9 (55.2)	12.3 (54.1)	12.0 (53.6)	11.8 (53.2)	12.0 (53.6)	12.4 (54.3)	12.6 (54.7)	12.0 (53.6)	12.3 (54.1)
Mean daily minimum °C (°F)	4.0 (39.2)	4.8 (40.6)	6.2 (43.2)	7.0 (44.6)	7.3 (45.1)	6.8 (44.2)	6.6 (43.9)	5.9 (42.6)	5.6 (42.1)	6.3 (43.3)	6.4 (43.5)	4.7 (40.5)	6.0 (42.8)
Average precipitation mm (inches)	24.5 (0.96)	46.4 (1.83)	64.7 (2.55)	109.2 (4.30)	77.0 (3.03)	51.7 (2.04)	34.5 (1.36)	35.0 (1.38)	54.3 (2.14)	107.6 (4.24)	71.4 (2.81)	37.6 (1.48)	713.8 (28.10)
Average precipitation days	8	10	14	17	19	18	18	17	16	19	17	10	182
Average relative humidity (%)	73	73	74	76	77	77	76	76	76	77	78	75	76
Mean monthly sunshine hours	189.1	155.5	136.4	117.0	124.0	105.0	127.1	124.0	117.0	127.1	138.0	136.4	1,596.6
Mean daily sunshine hours	6.1	5.5	4.4	3.9	4.0	3.5	4.1	4.0	3.9	4.1	4.6	4.4	4.4
Source: Instituto de Hidrologia Meteorologia y Estudios Ambientales

== Gallery ==
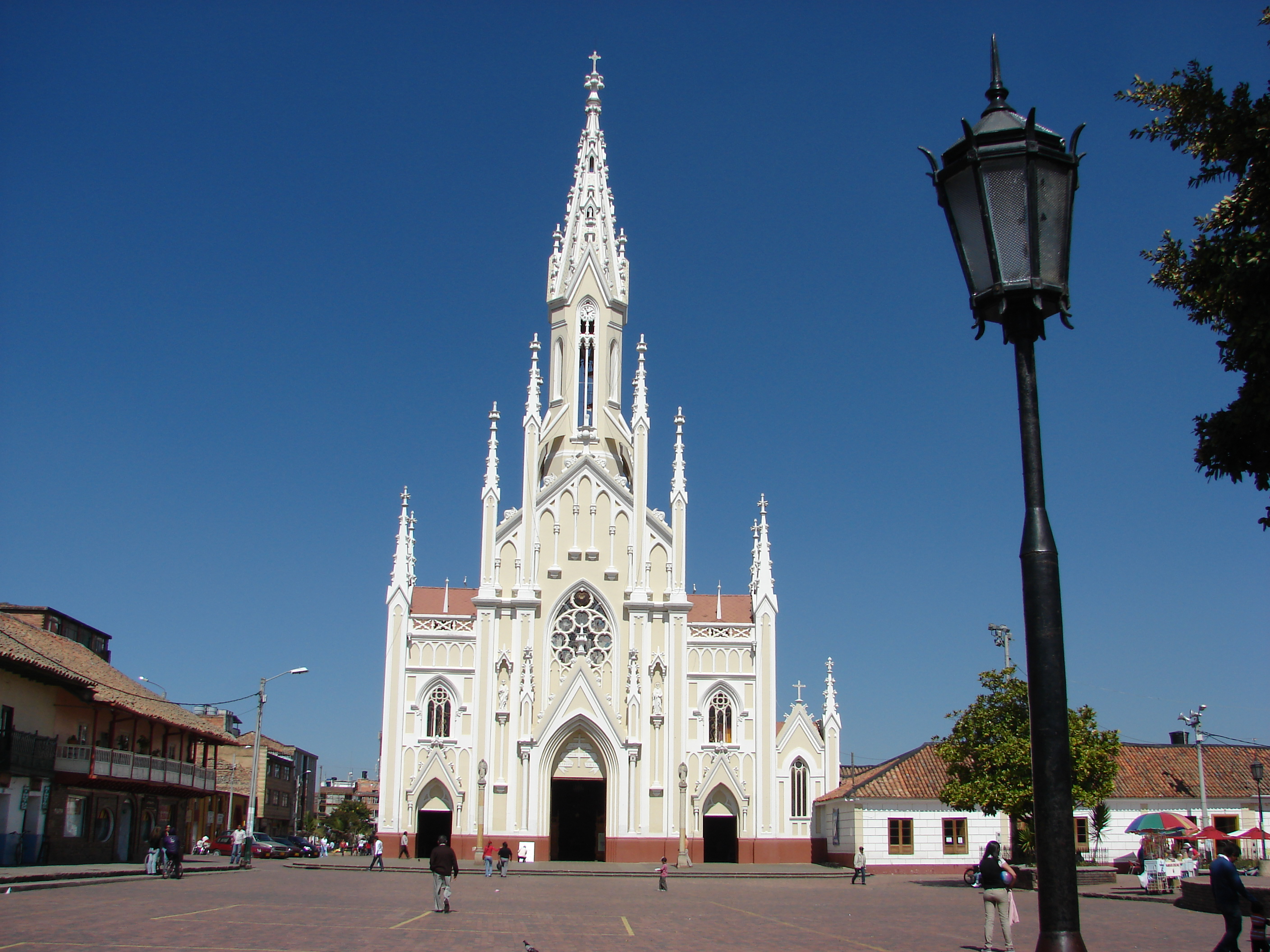
Church of Ubaté

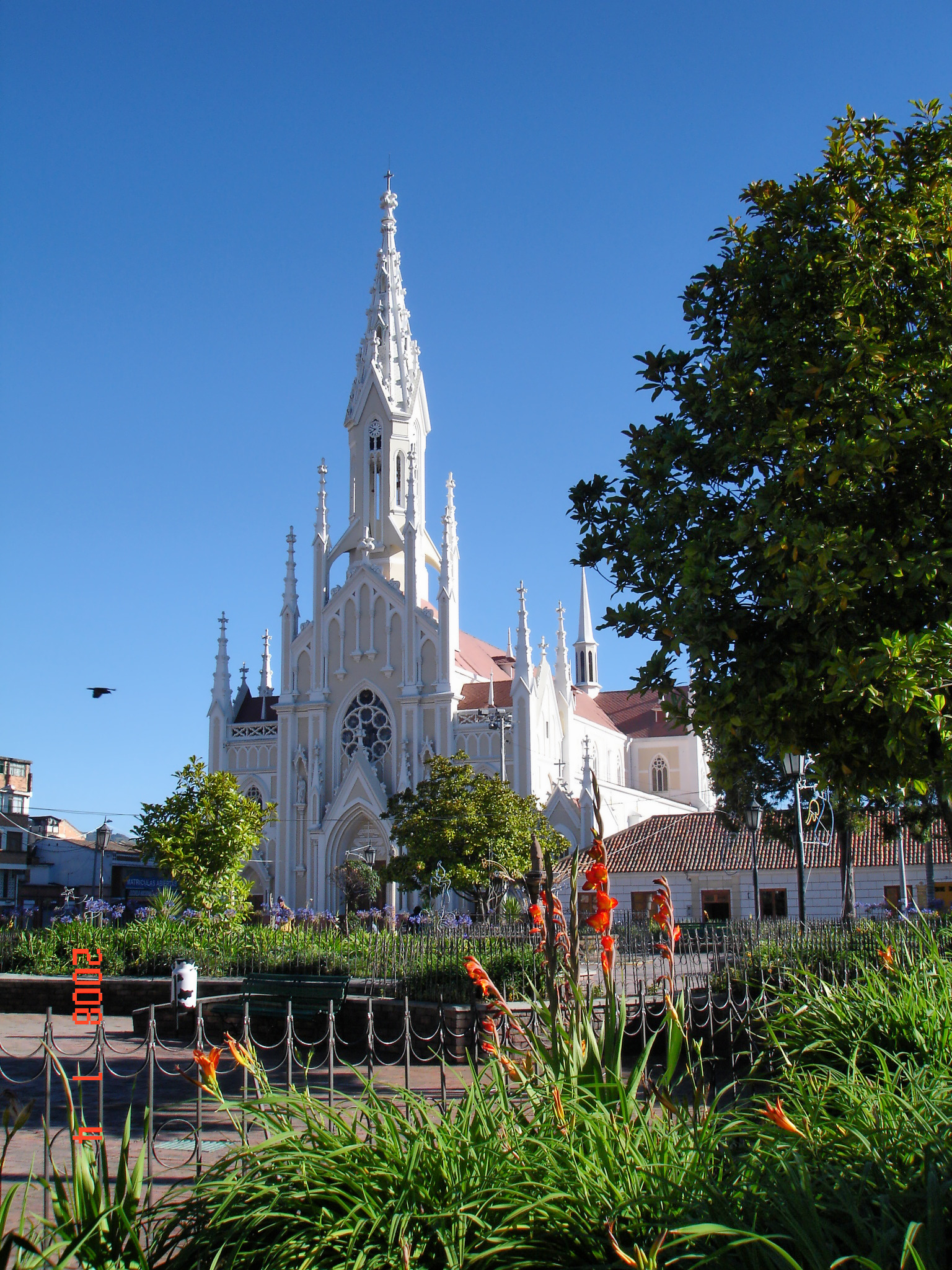
Church

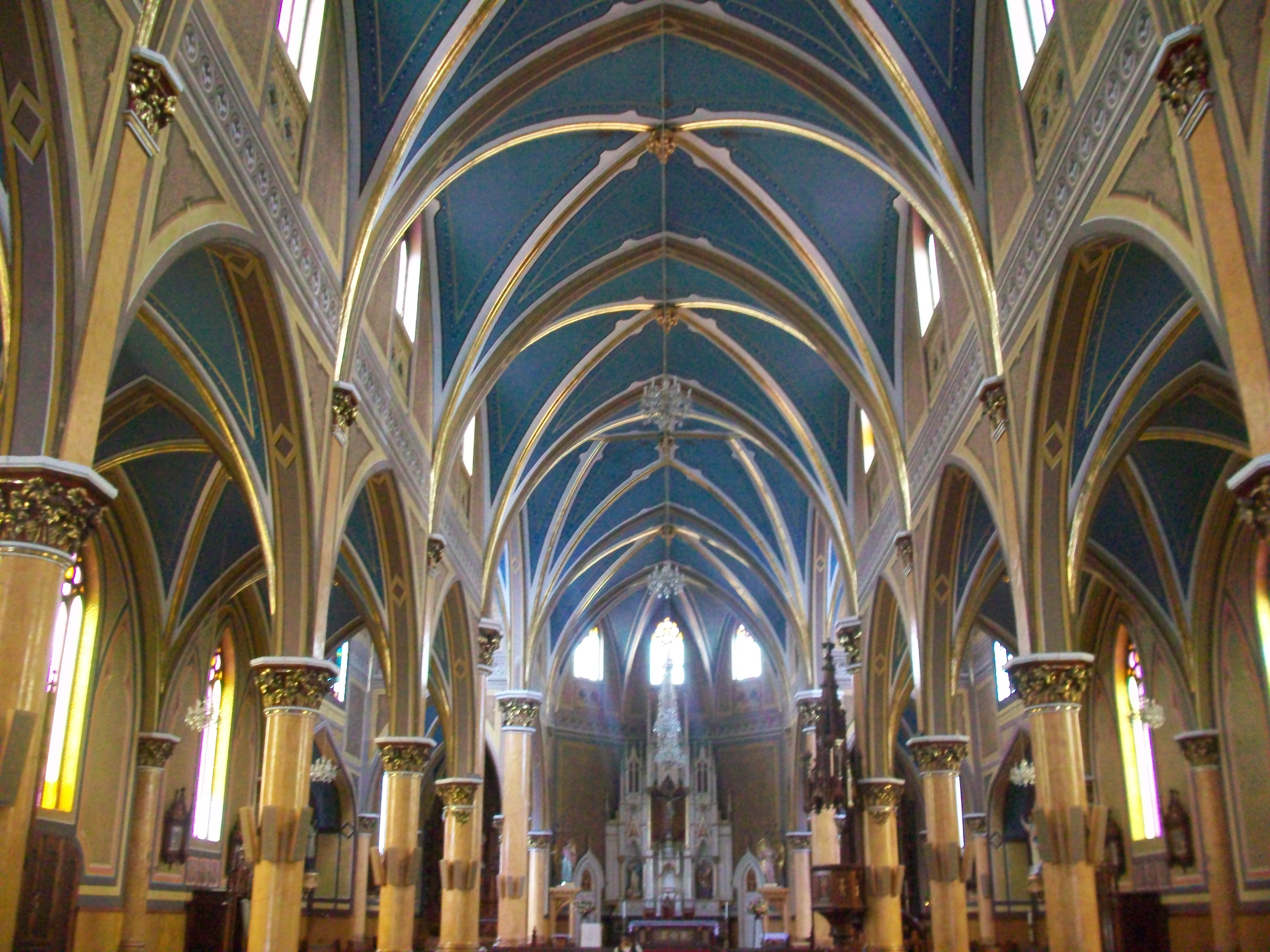
Church interior

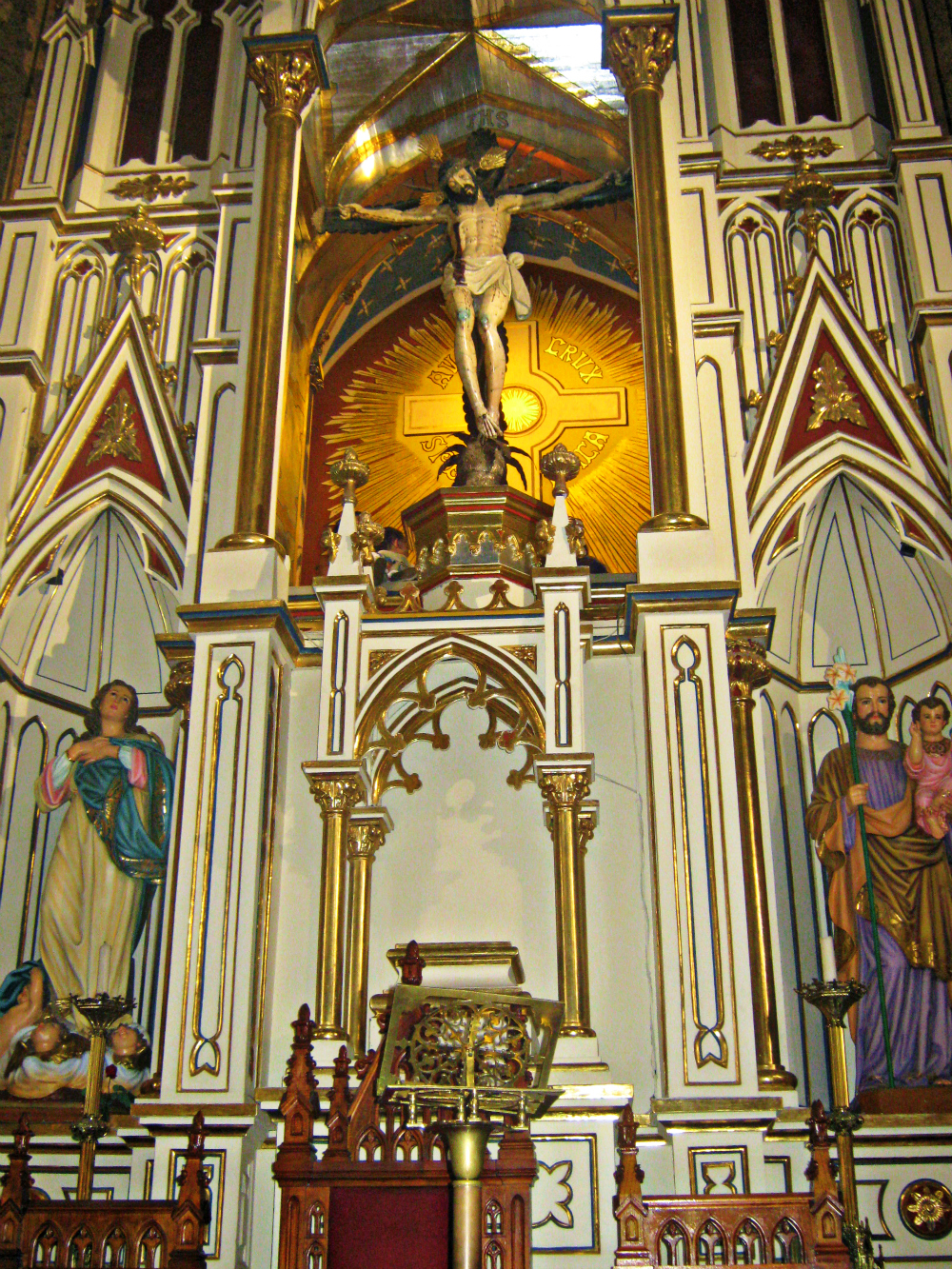
Church altar

== Bibliography ==
- Restrepo Arcila, Roberto Arturo (2002). Sabiduría, poder y comprensión: América se repiensa desde sus orígenes [Wisdom, power and understanding: America thinks again about its origins] (in Spanish). Siglo del Hombre. pp. 1–199. ISBN 9789586650533.
