= Suaita =

Municipality and town in Santander Department, Colombia

Coordinates: 6°06′N 73°26′W

- Flag Coat of arms

- Location of the municipality and town of Suaita in the Santander Department of Colombia
- Country: Colombia
- Department: Santander
- Province: Comunera
- Founded: 1 April 1699

Government
  - Mayor: Alonso Pulido Rangel (2024–2028)

Area
  - City: 280.82 km^{2} (108.43 sq mi)
- Elevation: 1,700 m (5,600 ft)

Population (2026)
  - City: 10,287
  - Urban: 2,568
- Demonym: Suaitano
- Website: www.suaita-santander.gov.co

Suaita is a municipality of Colombia. It is located in the south of the Santander Department, in the territory of the Suárez River basin (middle Suárez), which is part of the Comunera Province.

== Toponymy ==
Suaita is an Indigenous word meaning "Arm or Ray of the Sun".

== History ==
It was inhabited by the tribe of the Corbaraque Indians, warriors of the Guane people. It was erected as a parish in 1675, on the lands now occupied by the La Candelaria estate (hacienda) on the bank of the Lenguaruco River, and was moved in 1810 to a plot of land donated by Juan Crisóstomo Echeverría on 14 June of that year; this is the site it occupies today.

== General information ==
Suaita is located in the Comunera Province, 190 km (120 mi) from Bucaramanga, and covers an area of 298 km^{2} (115 sq mi). The average temperature is 20 °C (68 °F).

This municipality has the privilege of being one of the first places in Colombia to see an important industrial complex born and grow. General Lucas Caballero founded a factory for yarns, liquors and chocolates in 1915 in San José de Suaita.

The construction of the Church of Nuestra Señora de la Candelaria, or of the Purification, dates from 1952, and is notable for its Mozarabic architecture and its blend of colonial and Baroque styles. Built of carved stone, it has two towers in a Gothic-Byzantine style that resemble the domes of Saint Basil's Cathedral in Moscow, onion-shaped domes, 16 columns with intermediate lanterns, and pointed arches in its interior. The clock was donated by the industrialist Victor Martínez Villalba.

The House of Culture (Casa de la Cultura) bears the name of the master Luis Alberto Acuña, who founded and organized it; some of his works are kept there today.

The Lucas Caballero Cultural and Administrative Center, a work of the governorship of Hugo Aguilar, is the driving force behind the municipality's cultural activities. It has an internet room, an auditorium, a library, a crafts room (with Suaita artisans), a culture room, an exhibition room, a training room, and a museum of the governors of Suaita; the Municipal Council also operates there.

== Boundaries ==
It is bordered on the north by the municipalities of Guadalupe and Oiba; on the east by Charalá; on the south by Gámbita and the Boyacá Department (municipalities of Santana and Chitaraque); and on the west by San Benito.

== Data ==
- Metres above sea level: from 1,100 to 2,400 m (3,600 to 7,900 ft) above sea level.
- Inhabitants: 11,705 in total, of whom 2,618 live in the municipal seat.

== Main products ==
The most widely cultivated agricultural products in the municipality are coffee, sugarcane, panela, citrus fruits, plantain, cassava, heliconias and sheep farming.

== Festivals ==
From 2 to 5 February the traditional fairs and festivals are held in honor of the Virgin of Candelaria. Locals and visitors gather in an atmosphere of happiness and friendship to share and enjoy the various events, such as horseback parades (cabalgatas), bullfights, dance contests, fireworks and street parties (verbenas).

== Suaita and the Virgin ==
More than two centuries ago, on 14 June 1810, Don Juan Crisóstomo de Echeverría, one of the largest landowners in the region, decided to donate some lands and put them in the name of the Virgin of La Candelaria so that the town could be rebuilt. Because of this, the town has a 90% rate of informality, as it is not known who owns the land.

This is the reality of the municipality of more than 10 thousand inhabitants. Although not paying property tax might seem like a benefit to the population, the situation has become a legal problem, since people who have lived in their homes for years do not have the title recognizing them as owners.

The situation also involves the church and the mayor's office, because the title to the church's property and to half of the land occupied by the mayor's office, according to the documentation, belongs to the Virgin.
