= Puente Nacional =

Puente Nacional may refer to:

- Puente Nacional, Santander, municipality of Colombia
- Puente Nacional, Veracruz, municipality of Mexico
