= Chitaraque =

Coordinates: 6°05′N 73°22′W

- Municipality and town
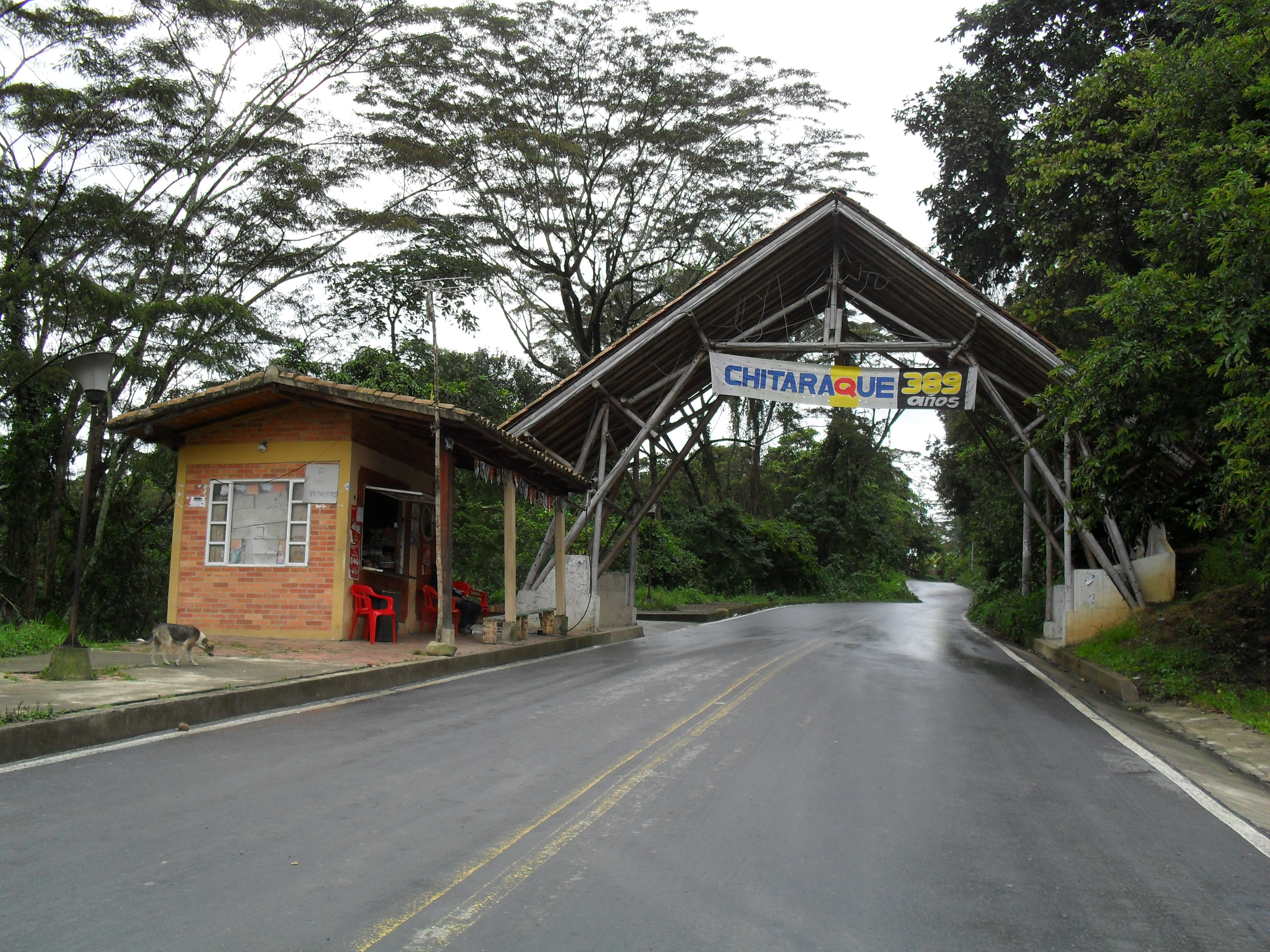
- Entrance of Chitaraque

- Flag

- Location of the municipality and town of Chitaraque in the Boyacá Department of Colombia
- Country: Colombia
- Department: Boyacá Department
- Province: Ricaurte Province
- Founded: 1 January 1621

Government
  - Mayor: Fabián Armando Silva Sánchez (2020-2023)

Area
  - Municipality and town: 157.65 km^{2} (60.87 sq mi)
  - Urban: 0.185 km^{2} (0.071 sq mi)
- Elevation: 1,575 m (5,167 ft)

Population (2015)
  - Municipality and town: 5,687
  - Density: 36.07/km^{2} (93.43/sq mi)
  - Urban: 1,131
- Time zone: UTC-5 (Colombia Standard Time)
- Website: Official website

Chitaraque is a town and municipality in the Ricaurte Province, part of the Colombian department of Boyacá. The urban centre is located at a distance of 104.6 kilometres (65.0 mi) from the department capital Tunja and situated at an altitude of 1,575 metres (5,167 ft) in the Eastern Ranges of the Colombian Andes. It borders Gámbita, Santander in the east and south, San José de Pare, Santana and Togüí in the west and Suaita, Santander in the north.

== Etymology ==
The name Chitaraque comes from Chibcha and means "Our vigorous farmfields from before".

== History ==
In the times before the Spanish conquest, Chitaraque was inhabited by the Poasaque tribe, belonging to the Muisca. It was ruled by the zaque of Hunza.

Modern Chitaraque was founded on January 1, 1621.

== Economy ==
Main economical activities of Chitaraque are agriculture (panela production, coffee, bananas and yuca) and milk farming.
