= Togüí =

Coordinates: 5°56′15″N 73°30′48″W

- Municipality and town
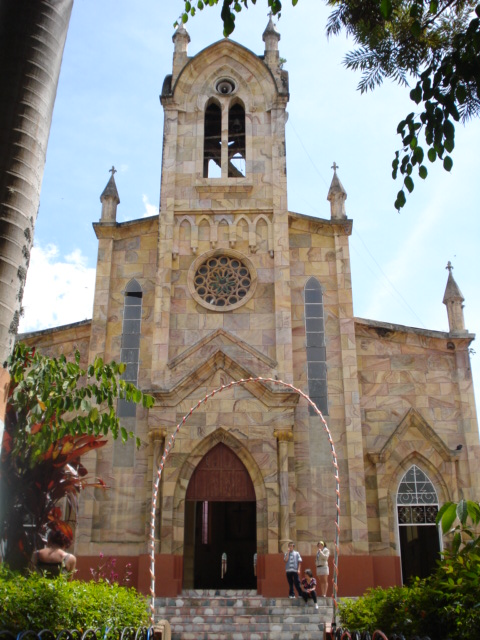
- Church of Togüí

- Flag Coat of arms

- Location of the municipality and town of Togüí in the Boyacá Department of Colombia
- Country: Colombia
- Department: Boyacá Department
- Province: Ricaurte Province
- Founded: 23 September 1821
- Founder: Francisco de Paula Santander

Government
  - Mayor: German Augusto Sánchez Sánchez (2020–2023)

Area
  - Municipality and town: 118 km^{2} (46 sq mi)
  - Urban: 6 km^{2} (2.3 sq mi)
- Elevation: 1,650 m (5,410 ft)

Population (2015)
  - Municipality and town: 4,966
  - Density: 42.1/km^{2} (109/sq mi)
  - Urban: 760
- Time zone: UTC-5 (Colombia Standard Time)
- Website: Official website

Togüí (Spanish pronunciation: [toˈɣwi]) is a town and municipality in Boyacá Department, Colombia, part of the subregion of the Ricaurte Province. The municipality is located in the Eastern Ranges of the Colombian Andes at an altitude of 1,650 metres (5,410 ft). It borders the municipalities of San José de Pare, Arcabuco, Moniquirá, Chitaraque and Gámbita.

== Etymology ==
Togüí in Chibcha means either "river of the wife" or "house of the dog".

== History ==
Before the arrival of the Spanish, the area of present-day Togüí was situated in a cultural and ethnic transition zone between the Eastern Cordillera and the Magdalena River valleys, where diverse indigenous groups interacted prior to colonial dominance.

The Yariguíes, an indigenous people of the Carib language family, occupied a vast forested region of the Middle Magdalena. They were organized into autonomous clans, including the Opones and Carares, each led by its own chief and inhabiting river basins such as the Carare, Opón, and Sogamoso. These clans actively resisted Spanish incursions during the 16th century.

The Opón-Carare language, now extinct, was part of the Carib linguistic family and was spoken in the river basins of Opón and Carare. Vocabulary records collected in the 19th and 20th centuries confirm the existence of these dialects and their connection to the Yariguí clans.

In addition to the Yariguíes and their clans, the northeastern region of Colombia was home to other indigenous peoples such as the Guane, related to the Chibcha cultural family, who settled in highland areas of Santander and Boyacá, and the Lache, another Chibcha group inhabiting parts of the Eastern Cordillera.

Due to this diversity of languages and indigenous societies across river valleys and mountains, Togüí was likely a space of cultural contact and interaction rather than an area dominated by a single ethnic identity.

Modern Togüí was founded on September 23, 1821, by Francisco de Paula Santander.

The mayor of Togüí, who was elected at the regional elections of October 2015, Jansson Téllez Rodríguez, has been accused of fraud and internalized. Upon this, Pedro Pablo Salas has been installed as interim mayor.

== Economy ==
Main economical activities of Togüí are agriculture and livestock farming. Agricultural products cultivated in the rural areas of the municipality are coffee, sugar cane, maize, bananas and yuca.

== Born in Togüí ==
- Pablo Hurtado, Olympic cyclist

== Gallery ==
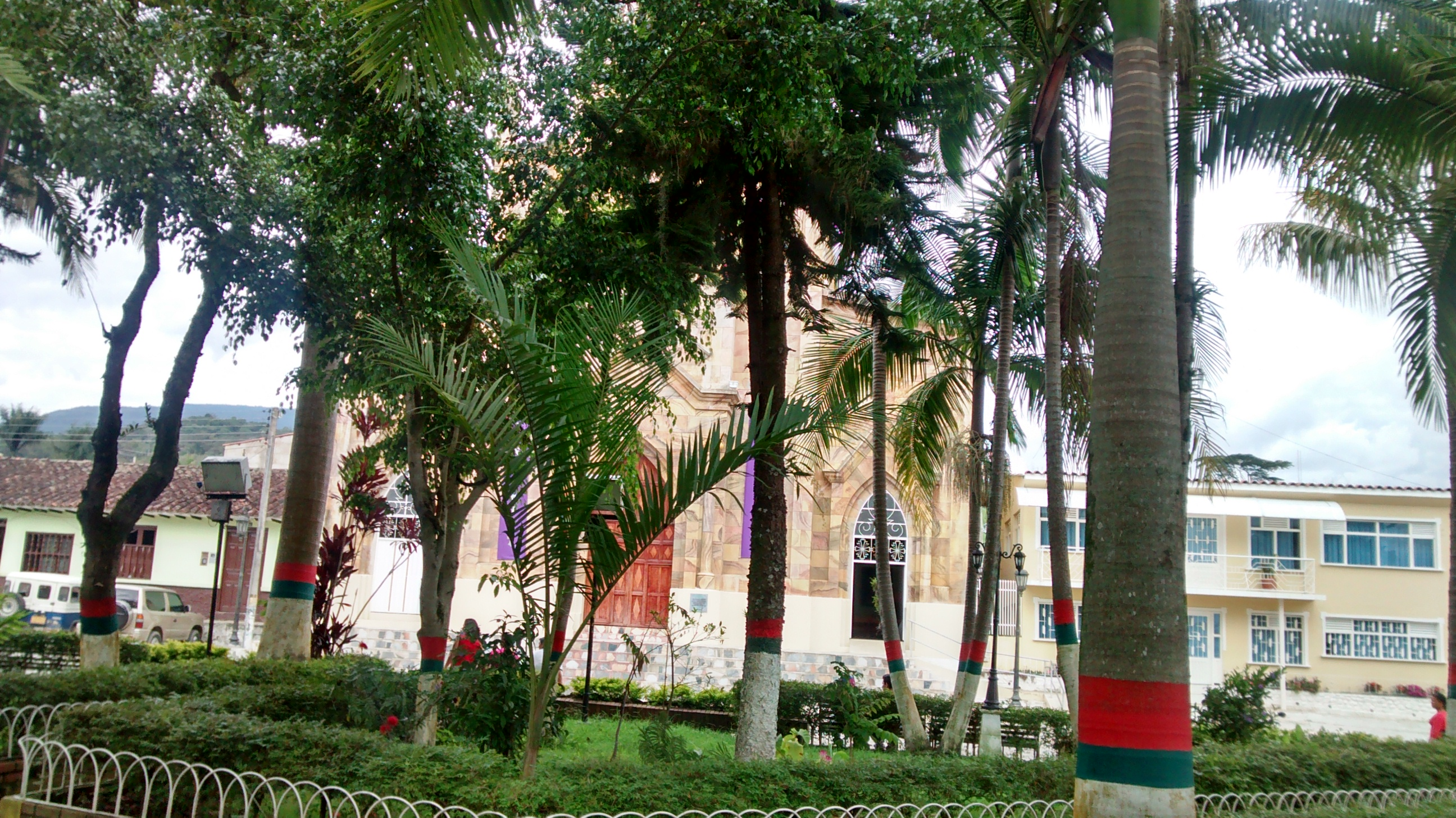
Central square Togüí
