= Luis Antonio Calvo =

Colombian musician and composer (1882–1945)

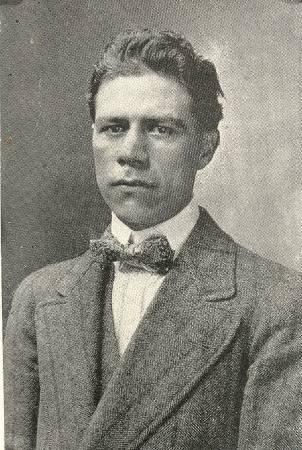
- Calvo c. 1916

Background information
- Also known as: Luis A. Calvo
- Born: 28 August 1882; Gámbita, Colombia
- Died: 22 April 1945 (aged 62) Agua de Dios, Colombia

Luis Antonio Calvo (1882–1945) was a Colombian musician and composer. He studied at the National Academy of Music under Guillermo Uribe Holguín, and played cello in the Lira Colombiana. In 1916, Calvo was diagnosed with leprosy, and he spent the rest of his life in a sanitorium where he composed many of his notable works.

== Early life and studies in Bogotá ==
Luis Antonio Calvo was born 28 August 1882 in Gámbita, in the Colombian department of Santander. At the age of 9, Calvo moved with his mother Marcelina Calvo and sister Florinda to Tunja, where he was taught music by Pedro José Gómez León while working for him as a courier. Calvo later wrote that Gómez "became like a father to me". Gómez directed the municipal band of Tunja, which Calvo joined at the age of 10, initially playing cymbals and then for four years on bass drum. In the meantime he learned to play violin, bandola, and euphonium.

In May 1905, Calvo moved to Bogotá. He started studying at the National Academy of Music in 1909, supported by a scholarship, where he was taught by Guillermo Uribe Holguín. Concurrently he played cello in the Academy's symphony orchestra and in the Lira Colombiana, led by Pedro Morales Pino.

== Later years in Agua de Dios ==
In 1916, Calvo was diagnosed with leprosy. He moved to a sanitorium in Agua de Dios, where he spent the rest of his life. Most of his significant compositional work was done after he moved to Agua de Dios. Calvo occasionally left the sanitorium to perform concerts; on one occasion he went to Bogotá to conduct the Orquesta Sinfónica de Colombia in a performance of his composition "Escenas pintorescas de Colombia". Calvo dedicated several of his compositions to Agua de Dios, including "Carmiña", "Lejano azul", and "Aguila negra".

In the sanitorium Calvo met his wife Ana Rodríguez, whose sister also lived there. They married in October 1942 in Anolaima.

Calvo died on 22 April 1945 in Agua de Dios. Following his death, his wife Ana preserved his house as a museum.

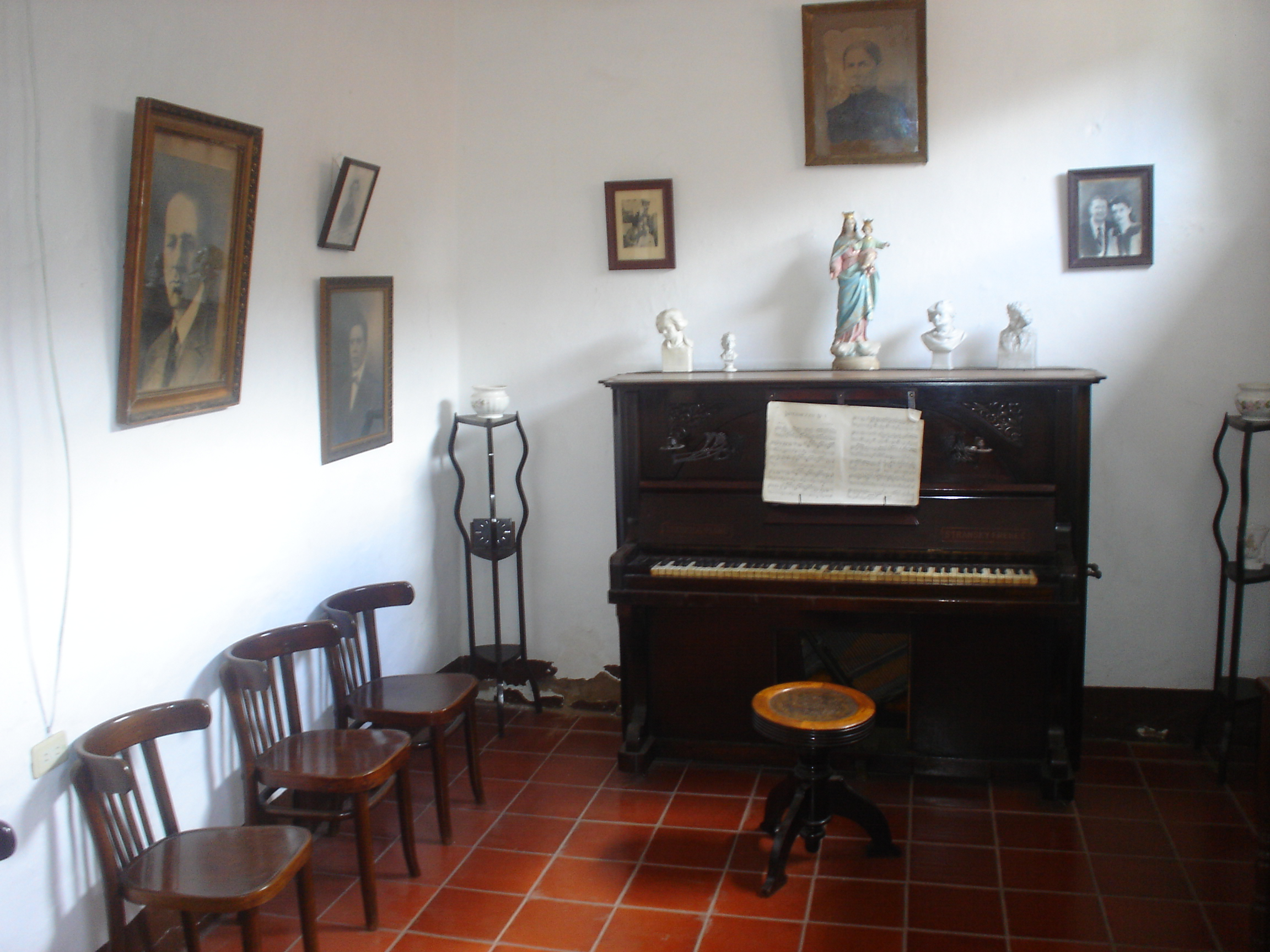
Calvo's piano at his home in Agua de Dios

== Musical style and compositions ==
Calvo composed in various styles including bambuco, pasillo, waltz, pasodoble, and tango. His romantic style is sometimes compared to that of Frédéric Chopin. Calvo's notable compositions include his four intermezzos and the danza "Libia".
