= Ricaurte Province =

Ricaurte Province Provincia de Ricaurte
- Province
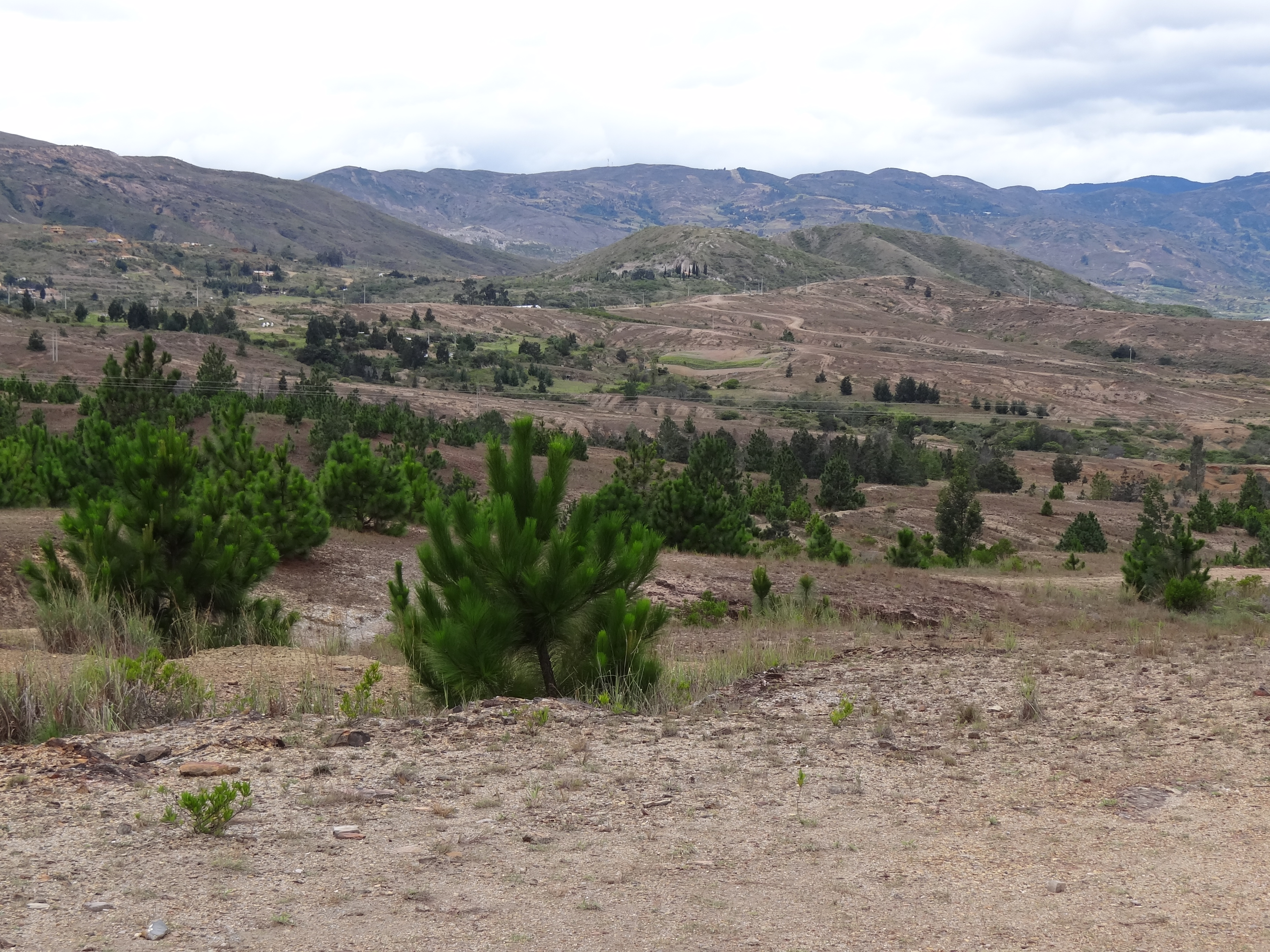
- Semi-desert of Villa de Leyva
- Etymology: Antonio Ricaurte
- Location of Ricaurte Province in Colombia
- Coordinates: 5°55′00″N 73°30′00″W
- Country: Colombia
- Department: Boyacá
- Capital: Moniquirá
- Municipalities: 13

Area
  - Total: 1,221 km^{2} (471 sq mi)
- Time zone: UTC−5 (COT)
- Indigenous groups: Muisca

The Ricaurte Province is a province of the Colombian Department of Boyacá. The province, named after independence hero Antonio Ricaurte, is formed by 13 municipalities.

== Municipalities ==
- Arcabuco
- Chitaraque
- Gachantivá
- Moniquirá
- Ráquira
- Sáchica
- San José de Pare
- Santa Sofía
- Santana
- Sutamarchán
- Tinjacá
- Togüí
- Villa de Leyva
