= Puente Nacional, Santander =

Coordinates: 5°53′N 73°41′W

- Municipality and town
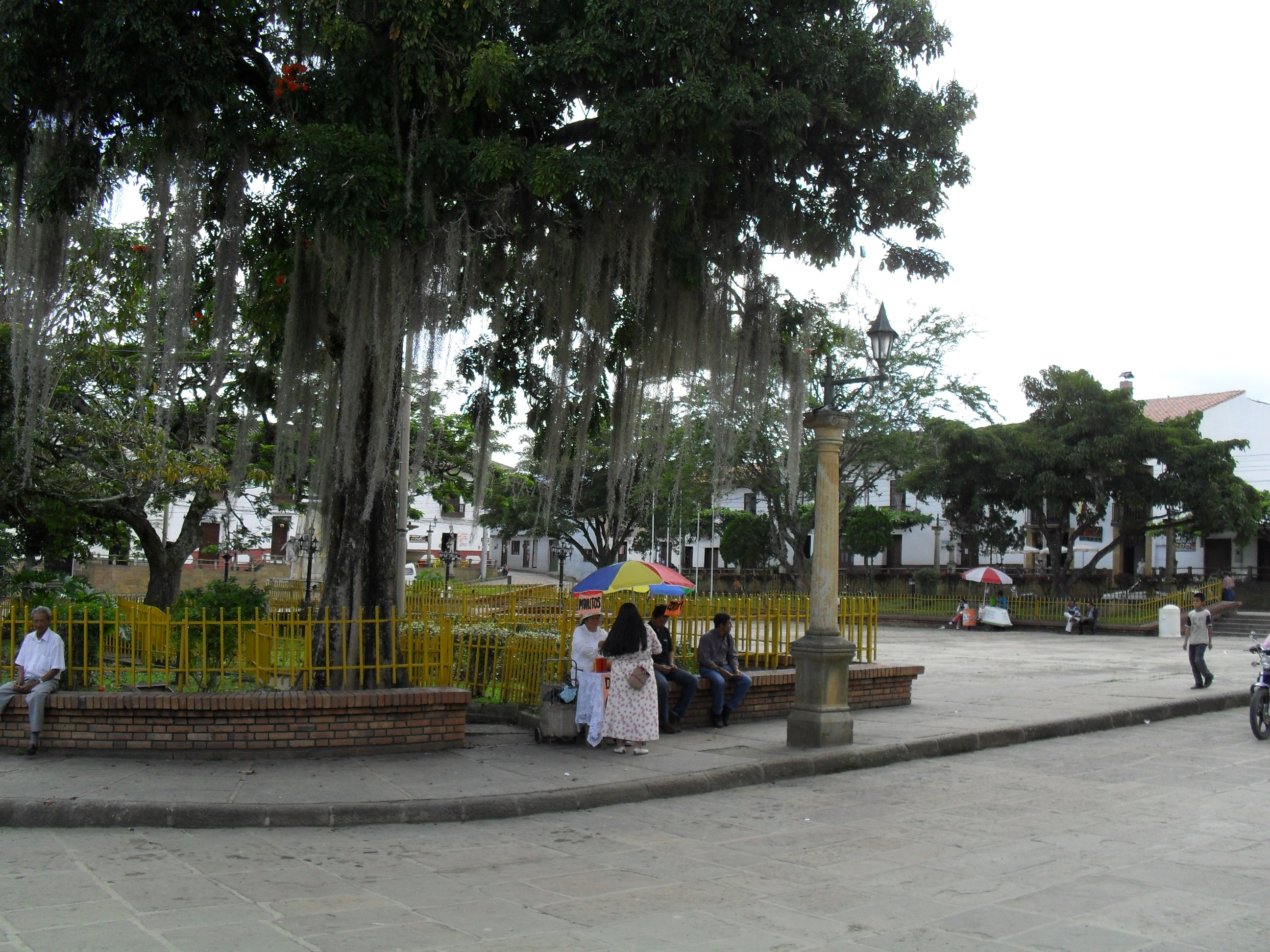

- Flag

- Location of the municipality and town of Puente Nacional, Santander in the Santander Department of Colombia.
- Country: Colombia
- Department: Santander Department
- Founded: 1556
- Founder: Andrés Díaz Venero de Leiva

Area
  - Total: 315 km^{2} (122 sq mi)
- Elevation: 1,625 m (5,331 ft)

Population (Census 2018)
  - Total: 12,586
  - Density: 40.0/km^{2} (103/sq mi)
- Demonym: Pontanalino -a
- Time zone: UTC-5 (Colombia Standard Time)
- Website: www.puentenacional-santander.gov.co

Puente Nacional (pronounced [ˈpwente nasjoˈnal]; Spanish for 'National Bridge') is an agricultural town and municipality in the Suárez River Valley, part of the Santander Department of northeastern Colombia. It is colloquially referred to as "Puente" by its inhabitants.

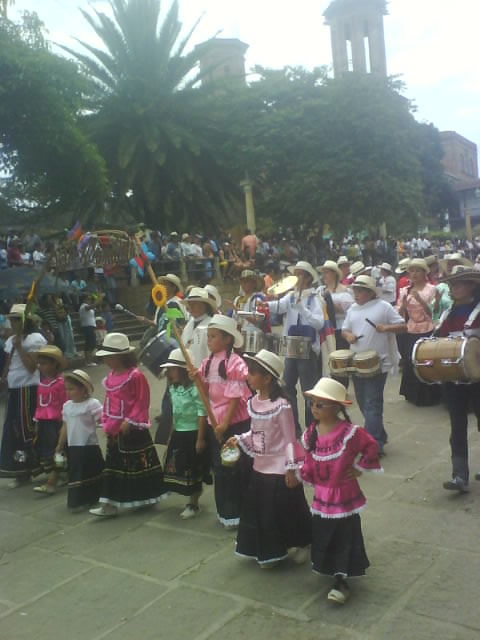
Annual parades celebrating local culture and music

The area was originally inhabited by four Muisca tribes, three of which were the Semisos, Irobaes, and Popobas. Their heritage now only survives in the names of three surrounding veredas.

The area between Puente and neighbouring Santa Sofía (formerly called Guatoque) was inhabited by a major tribe called the Sorocotá who governed a major commercial centre (possibly home to the region's largest agricultural market) which is why Puente's local radio station is called La Voz de Sorocotá (The Voice of Sorocotá). The town still has a market every Monday which sees locally sourced produce brought to the town from its many surrounding farms.

Gonzalo Jiménez de Quesada travelled south through the area in 1537 in the search for El Dorado. Having followed the course of the Magdalena River, his expedition then travelled down the Saravita, which formed the main trajectory of the subsequent conquests. It was in this area that some sources report that Quesada's men made the first ever encounter with a "truffle" crop later identified as the potato.

Following the Spanish conquests a new town was baptised Puente Real de Vélez, existing as a subsidiary to the town founded by Martin Galeano in 1539, before eventually acquiring its current name during the period following the Comunero Rebellions of 1781. These local uprisings set in motion the first wave of Spanish American victories against the Spanish Empire, although liberation only arrived after 1819. Every year on 8 May week, the town transforms with homage to the Comuneros. Townsfolk dress in traditional late-18th century attire and parades are held through the town.

In 1960 the town's Cantarrana Street was the setting of a now-regularly commemorated massacre. It happened two years after the end of La Violencia (The Violence); the name given to the ten year sectarian civil-political conflict which pitted conservatives against liberals. On September 29, tensions still present from the decennial conflict culminated with a shooting involving local brigand Efrain Gonzalez which left 11 civilians dead and injured 19.

== See also ==
- Cueva del Indio (Vélez) : "A short distance from the town center along the royal road (old entrance to Caráre) is the cave that was a refuge for the indigenous people* to protect themselves from attacks by the Spanish. Inside are underground waterfalls, a hall of stalagmites, stalactites and a fossil of the mummy of Cacique Agatá" (Muisca - agatáos & chipataes)¨*
- Windows of Tisquizoque waterfalls in Florían
- El Peñon, a centre of speleological research
- El Infiernito (Villa de Lleyva)
- The remains of 27 mummies were discovered in 1842 in neighbouring Gachantivá (between Puente and Villa de Lleyva). In 1989 they were temporarily held at the British Museum.
- The Hoyo de La Romera on the side of Santa Sofía is an alleged historical vestige to the area's indigenous past, though the claim is yet to be supported by archeological evidence.
