= Hugo Aguilar =

Colombian ex-law enforcement officer and politician

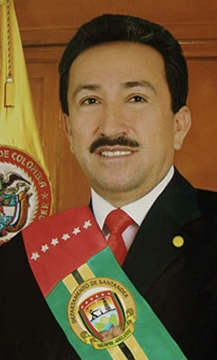
- Born: 4 January 1952 (age 74); Suaita, Santander
- Education: Lucas Caballero Barrera school Antonio Nariño de Moniquirá Institute
- Known for: Policeman, businessman, and politician
- Notable work: Governor of Santander
- Relatives: Ciro Aguilar Garavito and Blanca Naranjo Coronado
- Police career
- Department: Magdalena Police Department
- Service years: 1970–2004
- Rank: Lieutenant Colonel

Hugo Heliodoro Aguilar Naranjo (born January 4, 1952, in Suaita, Santander) is a Colombian former police officer, businessman, and politician. He retired with the rank of Lieutenant Colonel. Aguilar served as governor of Santander from 2004 to 2007.

In 1993, he led the police operation that resulted in the death of Medellín Cartel leader Pablo Escobar. In 2017, Aguilar stated in a press interview that after Escobar's death, he kept the latter's SIG Sauer pistol as a trophy.

== Early years ==
Hugo Aguilar was born to Ciro Aguilar Garavito and Blanca Naranjo Coronado. He attended the Lucas Caballero Barrera School in his hometown and later studied at the Antonio Nariño Institute in Moniquirá. On January 11, 1975, he enrolled at the General Santander Police Cadet School. He graduated as part of the 39th class of officers and was commissioned as a second lieutenant on November 5, 1976.

== Colombian police ==
Aguilar began his police career in 1970 as an officer at the Chapinero Police Station in Bogotá. In 1978, he became commander of the company of auxiliary bachilleres of the Magdalena Police Department. The following year, he joined the Judicial Intelligence and Investigation Service of Bogotá, and in 1980 he served as an officer at the Carabineros School Alejandro Gutiérrez in Manizales, aide-de-camp to the governor of Caldas, and as an effective lieutenant.

During the 1980s, he held various command positions, including police commander of Carurú, Mapiripán, and Miraflores in Guaviare, and of Tolú in Sucre. He received training in counter-guerrilla tactics, lancer and grenadier courses, explosives disposal, special operations, and marksmanship. Promoted to captain in 1980, he was appointed commander of counter-guerrilla operations in the clearance zones of Florida, Pradera, and Miranda in Valle del Cauca, and later served as police commander of Buga.

Aguilar was also assigned as an officer at the Santander General School, completed special operations training with the Spanish Civil Guard, and earned a degree in criminology from the Complutense University of Madrid in 1987. He subsequently served as commander of the Special Operations Corps (COPES) and as chief of security at the Santander General School.

He was promoted to major in 1989 and later completed additional studies, including specialisations in university teaching at the University of Belgrano (1991) and in criminalistics at the University Institute of the Argentine Federal Police (1992). He also served as intelligence chief in Medellín and as operational commander of the Search Bloc against the Medellín Cartel. Aguilar received training in staff command and Latin American issues at Fort Benning, United States.

He attained the rank of lieutenant colonel in 2004, at which time he requested retirement from active service.

== Operations against the guerrillas ==
During the presidency of Belisario Betancur, while the government was conducting peace negotiations with the guerrilla group M-19, Aguilar was promoted to captain and assigned to oversee the municipalities of Florida, Pradera, and Miranda in Valle del Cauca with two counter-guerrilla police units. In this role, he regained control of the area, arrested several individuals, and reported the capture of 19 people, among them future politician Carlos Alonso Lucio, who was later released along with his colleagues by presidential order.

== Distinctions and decorations ==
Aguilar received several commendations from the National Police, including the Civic Star (Commander category), the Medal for Valour (First Class, three times), the Services Medal (Category A, for 15 years of service), the Distinguished Services Medal (Category A, three times), the Cross for Police Merit (twice), the Gabriel González Educational Merit, and the Carlos Holguín Mallarino Medal. The National Army also awarded him the Medal of Distinguished Services in Public Order on two occasions.

In June 2006, the national government conferred upon him the honorary rank of colonel.

== Business career ==
Aguilar earned a degree in educational administration and a professional degree in business administration from the University of San Buenaventura. These qualifications enabled him to work as a university lecturer and as an adviser to agricultural and commercial enterprises, particularly in the department of Santander. He later served as president of the Guanentá and Comunera chapters of the National Federation of Merchants and represented the productive sector on the board of directors of the Corporación Autónoma Regional de Santander (CAS).

He pursued further studies in public management at the Industrial University of Santander and in the administration of health entities.

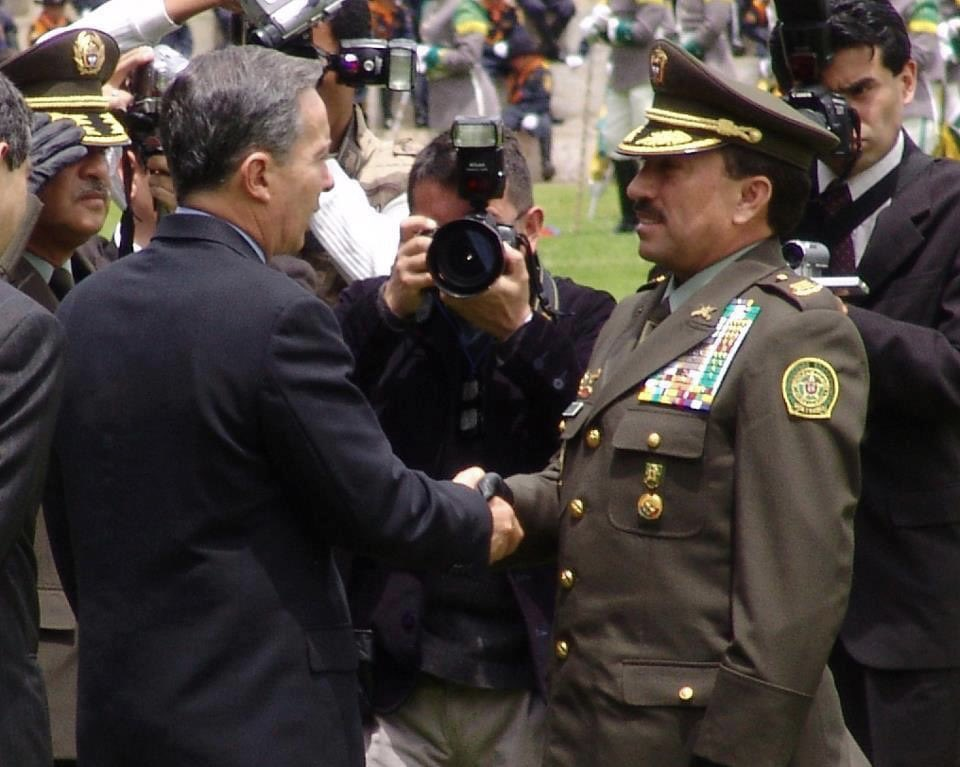
Aguilar with President Álvaro Uribe in 2006

== Political career ==
=== Early campaigns ===
Aguilar first entered politics as a candidate for mayor of Suaita and as a candidate for the municipal council of San Gil, although he was not elected to either position. In 2001, with the endorsement of the Citizen Convergence Party, he won 17,000 votes and was elected as a deputy to the Departmental Assembly of Santander.

=== Governor of Santander ===
In the early 2000s, Santander faced significant security, administrative, and financial challenges. Aguilar resigned his assembly seat in 2002 to run for governor in the 2003 elections. He won the contest, defeating the Liberal Party candidate, ending that party's 17-year control of the office.

As the first governor elected outside the traditional parties in Santander's history, Aguilar launched a program called Santander en Serio ("Santander in Earnest"). Its stated priorities included improving public security, stabilising public finances, promoting transparency in government, expanding social investment, and developing the department's economy through tourism.

During his term, his administration oversaw the opening of Chicamocha National Park in the Chicamocha Canyon as part of a regional tourism strategy; the recovery of the public hospital network; an 86 percent increase in primary education coverage; the paving of 230 kilometres of roads; the creation of two local economic development agencies; and the recovery of the state-owned liquor enterprise. Other initiatives included promoting regional identity through the institutionalisation of May 13 as the "Day of Santandereanidad" and the introduction of a regional curriculum in schools; establishing Provincial Development Centers as a model of territorial organisation; implementing ISO 9000 and GP1000 quality standards in contracting and financial management; restoring the Neomundo science and technology park in Bucaramanga; modernising financial management; constructing a cocoa processing plant; and completing the Barrancabermeja–Yondó bridge project over the Magdalena River.

His cabinet included Oscar Josué Reyes Cárdenas, Didier Alberto Tavera Amado, Rafael Valero Cetina, Manuel Enrique Niño Gómez (Government); Emilia Lucía Ospina Cadavid (Finance); Ricardo Flórez Rueda and Cristian Rojas Hernández (Health); Bonel Patiño Noreña, Héctor Murillo, Zoraida Celis Carrillo, Clara Isabel Rodríguez Serrano, Milce Idárraga de González (Education); Adolfo Pinilla Plata, Rafael Valero Cetina (Infrastructure); Luis Antonio Mesías Velasco, Luis Emilio Rojas Pabón (Planning); Didier Alberto Tavera Amado, Juan Carlos Sierra Ayala, Guillermo Henrique Gómez Paris, Samuel Prada Cobos, Holger Díaz Hernández (Development); Víctor Hugo Morales Núñez, Iván Darío Porras Gómez (Agriculture and Rural Development); Juana Yolanda Bazán Achury, Gladys Elfidia Ballesteros Miranda (General Secretariat); Gilberto Tirado Pardo, Mary Matilde Quijano Orduz, María Aidé Afanador Moreno (Private Secretariat); and Jorge Céspedes Camacho, Oscar Alfonso Téllez Valenzuela (Legal Affairs).

=== Parapolitics conviction ===
On January 31, 2011, at the start of a new gubernatorial campaign, Aguilar was dismissed from office and barred from holding public office for 20 years by the Attorney General's Office, which concluded that he had links to the paramilitary group Autodefensas Unidas de Colombia (AUC). In a parallel criminal investigation, an arrest warrant was issued against him, which was executed in July 2011. During this period, he campaigned in support of his son Richard Aguilar, who was elected governor of Santander in the October 2011 elections.

In 2013, based partly on the testimony of paramilitary commander Salvatore Mancuso, the Supreme Court of Justice sentenced Aguilar to nine years in prison for aggravated conspiracy. He served part of the sentence in San Gil prison and was released on parole after approximately seven years, in March 2015.

== Books ==
Aguilar is the author of the book Así maté a Pablo Escobar (This Is How I Killed Pablo Escobar), which was reported to have achieved high sales in Colombia, Peru, Spain, and Germany.

== Popular culture ==
- In the television series Pablo Escobar, The Drug Lord, Aguilar is portrayed by actor Mario Ruiz.
- In the television series Tres Caínes, the character Hugo Pallomar, based on Aguilar, is portrayed by Andrés Soleibe.
