= Santa Sofía, Boyacá =

Santa Sofía Guatoque
- Municipality and town
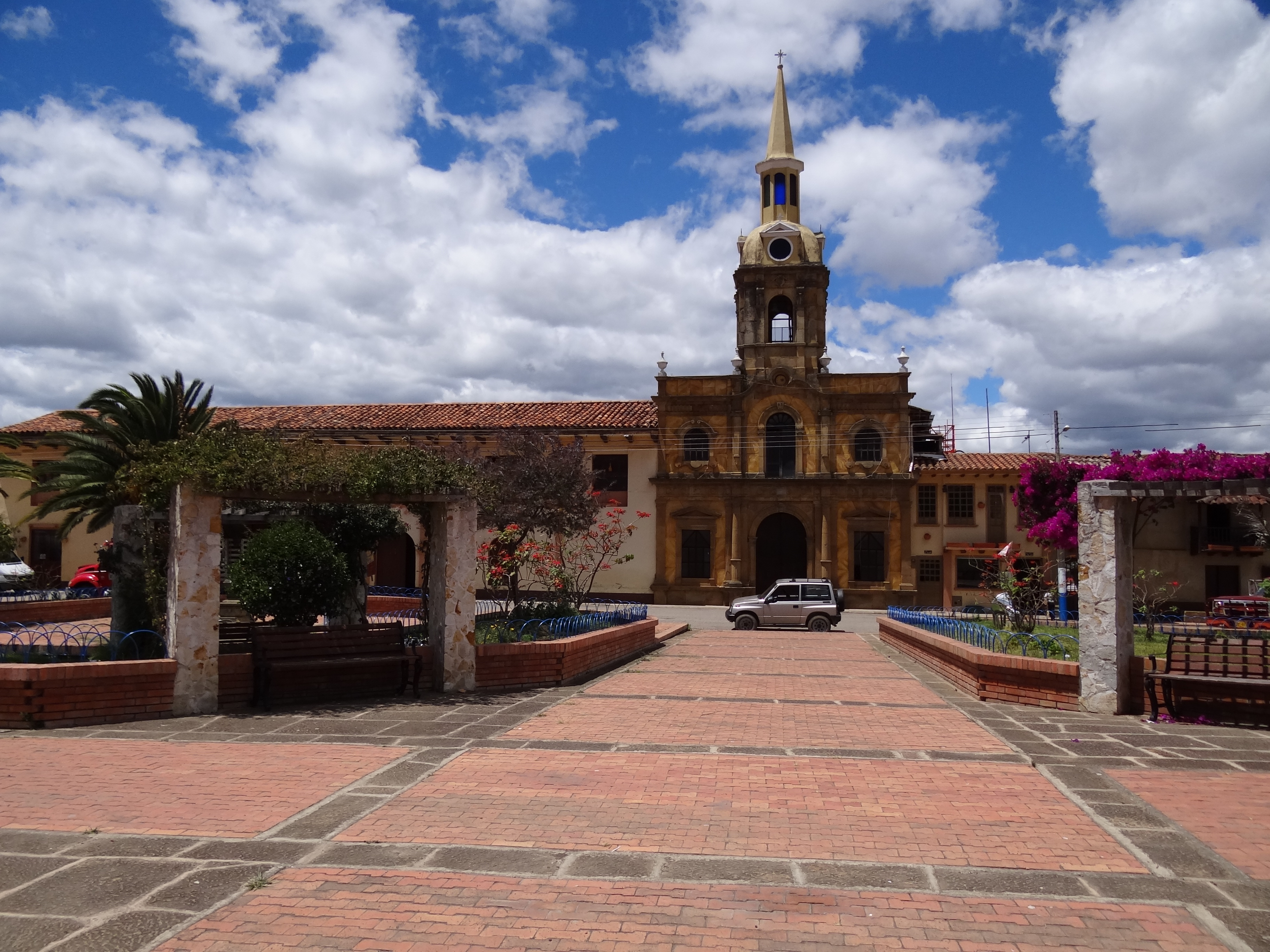
- Central square of Santa Sofía

- Flag

- Location of the municipality and town of Santa Sofía in the Boyacá Department of Colombia
- Coordinates: 5°45′N 73°35′W
- Country: Colombia
- Department: Boyacá Department
- Province: Ricaurte Province
- Founded: 10 January 1810
- Founder: Spanish colonists ordered by Amar y Borbón

Government
  - Mayor: William Gustavo Parra Merchán (2020-2023)

Area
  - Municipality and town: 78 km^{2} (30 sq mi)
  - Urban: 18 km^{2} (6.9 sq mi)
- Elevation: 2,387 m (7,831 ft)

Population (2015)
  - Municipality and town: 2,704
  - Density: 35/km^{2} (90/sq mi)
  - Urban: 721
- Time zone: UTC-5 (Colombia Standard Time)
- Website: Official website

Santa Sofía is a town and municipality in the Department of Boyacá, part of the subregion of the Ricaurte Province, Colombia. The urban centre of Santa Sofía is located at an altitude of 2,387 metres (7,831 ft) on the Altiplano Cundiboyacense, with the highest elevated parts of the municipality, that have a páramo ecosystem, reaching 3,000 metres (9,800 ft). Santa Sofía borders Moniquirá in the north, Gachantivá in the west, Villa de Leyva in the southeast, Sutamarchán in the south, Saboyá in the southwest, and Puente Nacional, Santander in the west.

== Etymology ==
Originally, Santa Sofía was called Guatoque, a name derived from Muysccubun, meaning "creek of the mountain". The name was changed in 1906 to Santa Sofía, because mail that was meant to go to Guateque, in southern Boyacá, was accidentally delivered in Guatoque. The name Santa Sofía was given to the town honouring Sofía Ángulo de Reyes, spouse of the then president of Colombia Rafael Reyes.

== History ==
The area of Santa Sofía before the Spanish conquest was inhabited by the Muisca, who used the area to cross the lands towards the northern parts of their Muisca Confederation.

It was in nearby Sorocotá that De Quesada and his men first discovered the potato in 1537 together with maize and beans alongside many aspects of local culture and customs as described in the History of the conquest of the New kingdom of Granada by Juan de Castellanos.

Within the boundaries of the municipalities is located the Hoyo de la Romera, a sinkhole where unfaithful Muisca women were punished.

Santa Sofía, then as Guatoque, was founded by Spanish colonists ordered by Amar y Borbón on January 10, 1810, just before the independence of Colombia from the Spanish Empire was called.

== Climate ==
Santa Sofía has a subtropical highland climate (Köppen: Cfb) with consistently mild temperatures.

Climate data for Santa Sofía (Inst Agr Sta Sofia), elevation 2,300 m (7,500 ft), (1981–2010)
Month	Jan	Feb	Mar	Apr	May	Jun	Jul	Aug	Sep	Oct	Nov	Dec	Year
Mean daily maximum °C (°F)	21.9 (71.4)	22.4 (72.3)	22.2 (72.0)	21.9 (71.4)	21.6 (70.9)	21.4 (70.5)	21.1 (70.0)	21.4 (70.5)	21.8 (71.2)	21.6 (70.9)	21.2 (70.2)	21.4 (70.5)	21.6 (70.9)
Daily mean °C (°F)	16.1 (61.0)	16.3 (61.3)	16.3 (61.3)	16.4 (61.5)	16.4 (61.5)	16.2 (61.2)	15.9 (60.6)	16.1 (61.0)	16.1 (61.0)	16.0 (60.8)	15.9 (60.6)	15.9 (60.6)	16.1 (61.0)
Mean daily minimum °C (°F)	10.5 (50.9)	10.7 (51.3)	11.2 (52.2)	11.7 (53.1)	11.9 (53.4)	11.6 (52.9)	11.3 (52.3)	11.5 (52.7)	11.3 (52.3)	11.1 (52.0)	11.1 (52.0)	10.9 (51.6)	11.2 (52.2)
Average precipitation mm (inches)	49.5 (1.95)	74.2 (2.92)	109.5 (4.31)	146.5 (5.77)	120.9 (4.76)	69.0 (2.72)	60.8 (2.39)	55.7 (2.19)	86.7 (3.41)	155.4 (6.12)	136.1 (5.36)	81.2 (3.20)	1,136.3 (44.74)
Average precipitation days (≥ 1.0 mm)	9	13	17	19	19	14	13	12	15	20	18	13	176
Average relative humidity (%)	73	73	74	76	75	74	73	72	72	75	77	76	74
Source: Instituto de Hidrologia Meteorologia y Estudios Ambientales

== Economy ==
Main economical activities of Santa Sofía are livestock farming and agriculture, especially curuba, tomatoes and strawberries. Other products cultivated are potatoes, maize, peas, beans, sugarcane and yuca.

=== Tourism ===
Santa Sofía is a rural community that gives access to the Guatoque Páramo and the Paso del Ángel, an ancient indigenous road. There are various caves and waterfalls located around Santa Sofía.

== Gallery ==
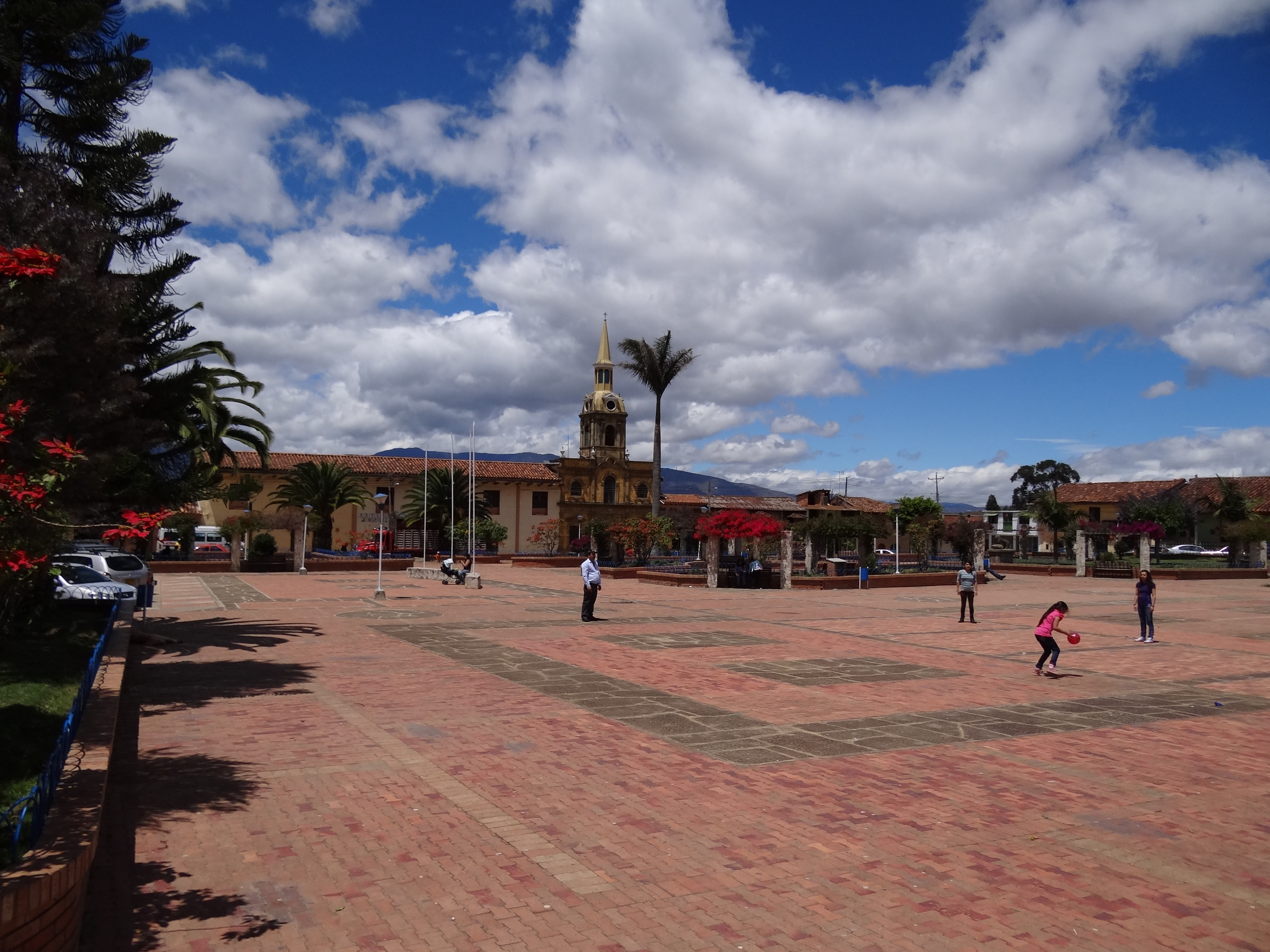
Central square

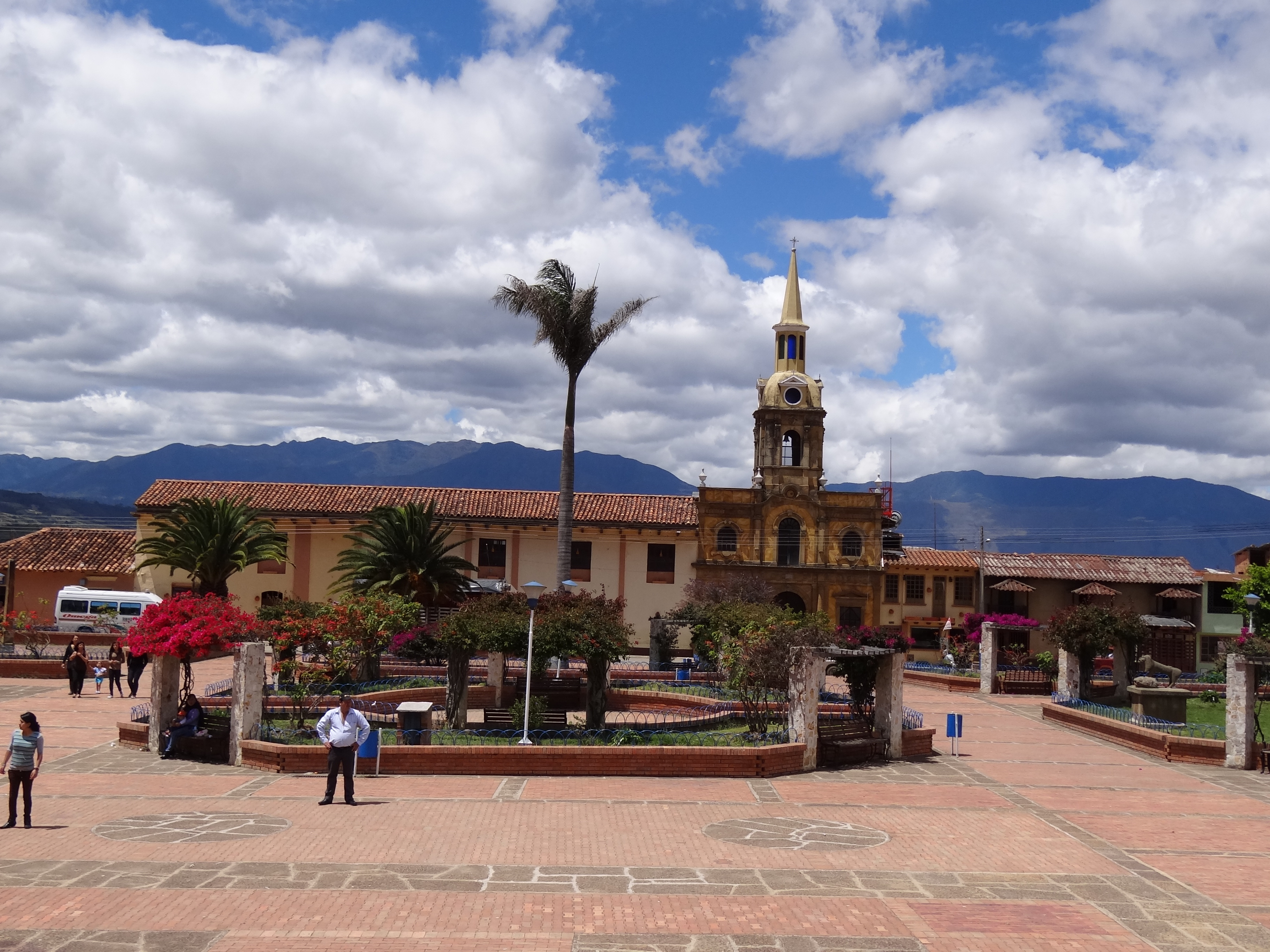
Central square

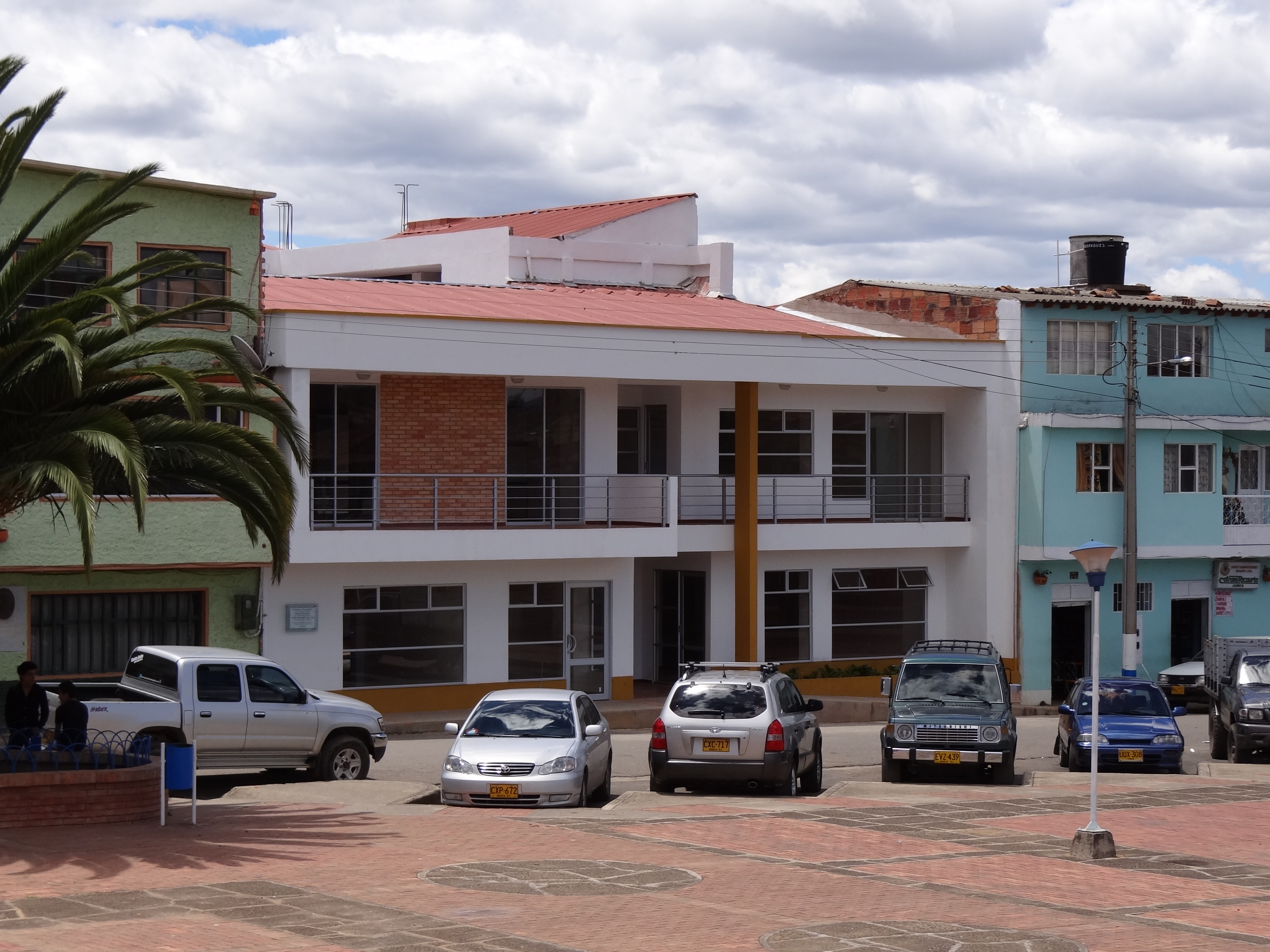
Town council building

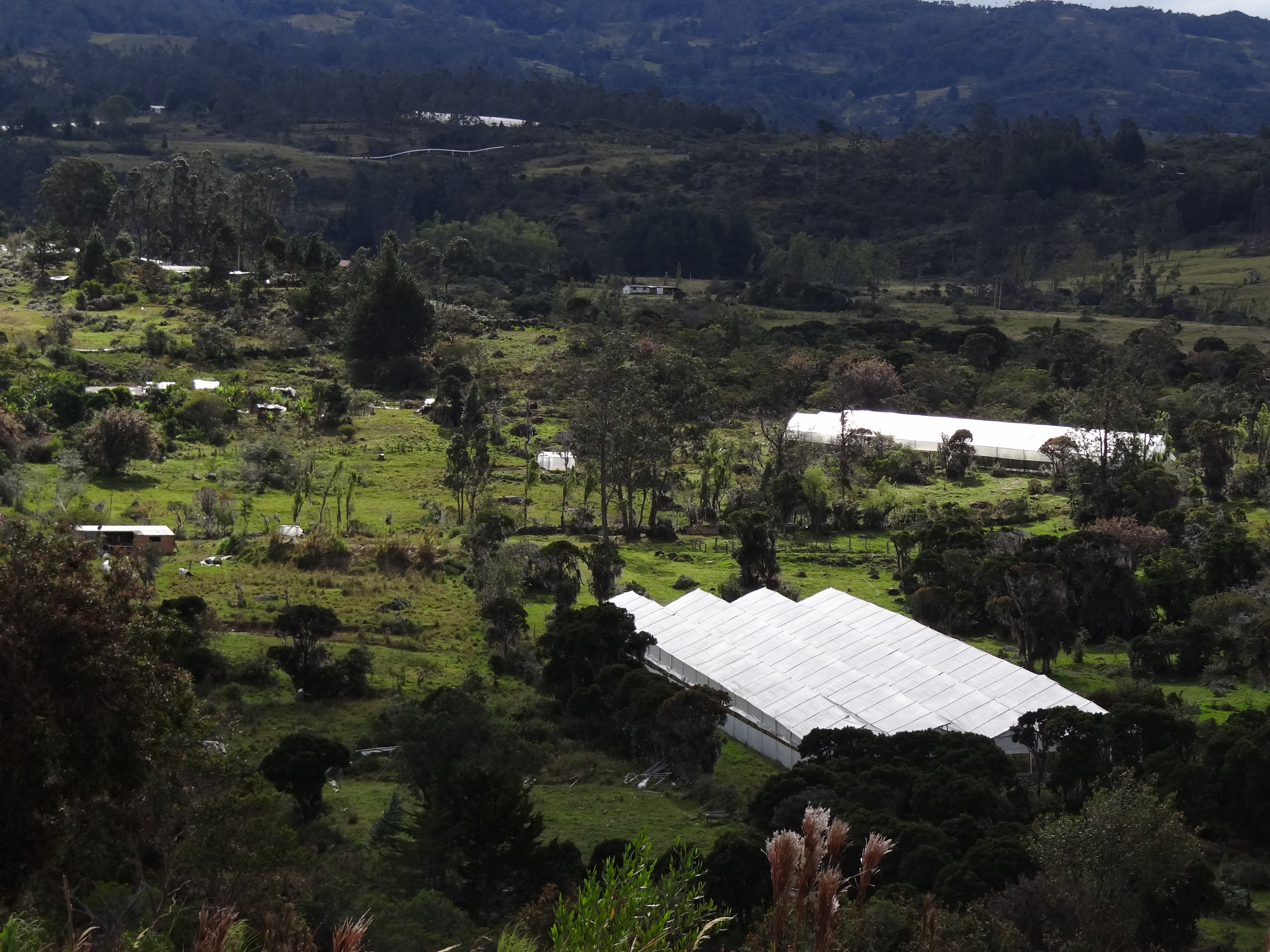
Greenhouses
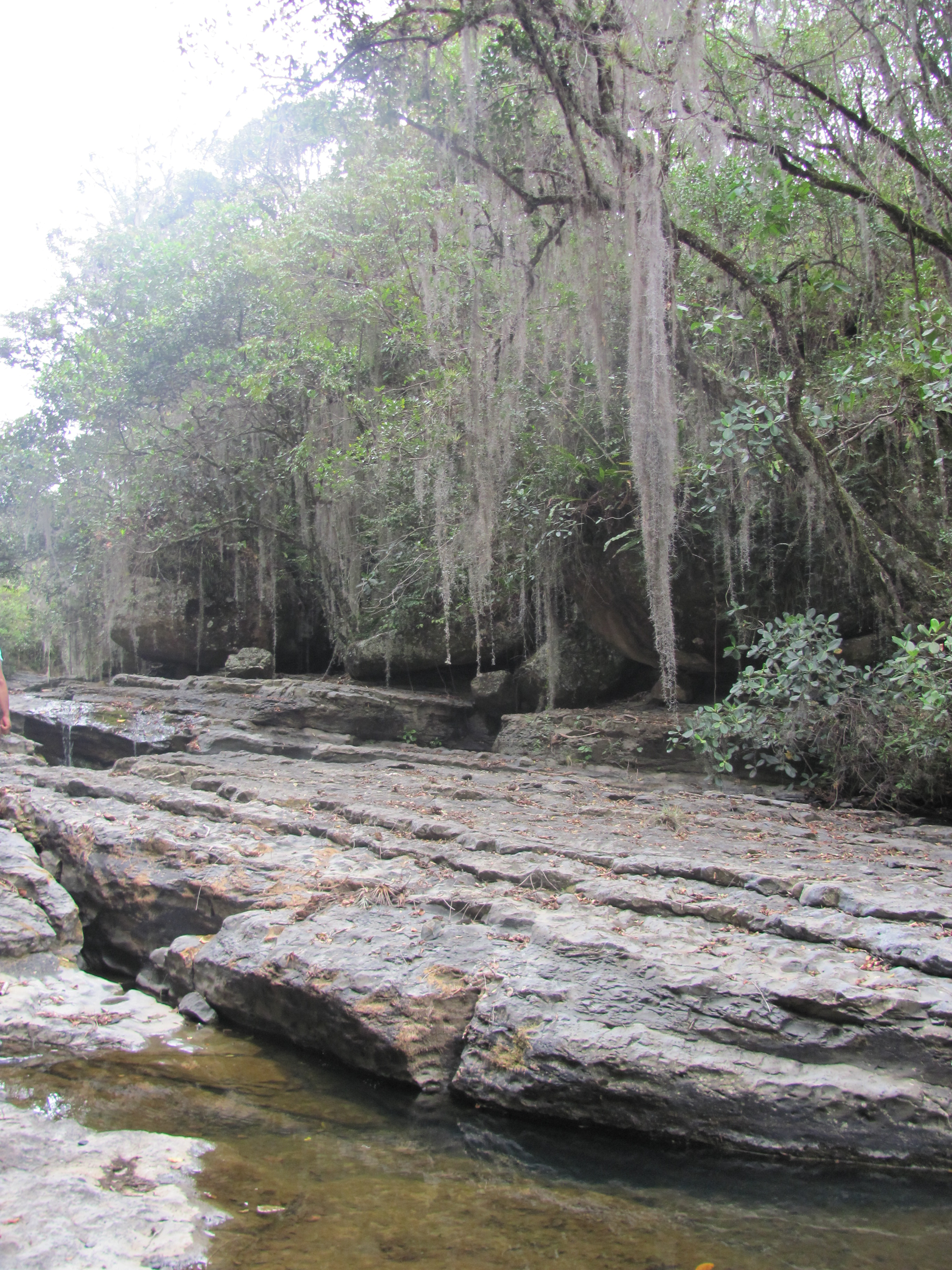
Guatoque creek

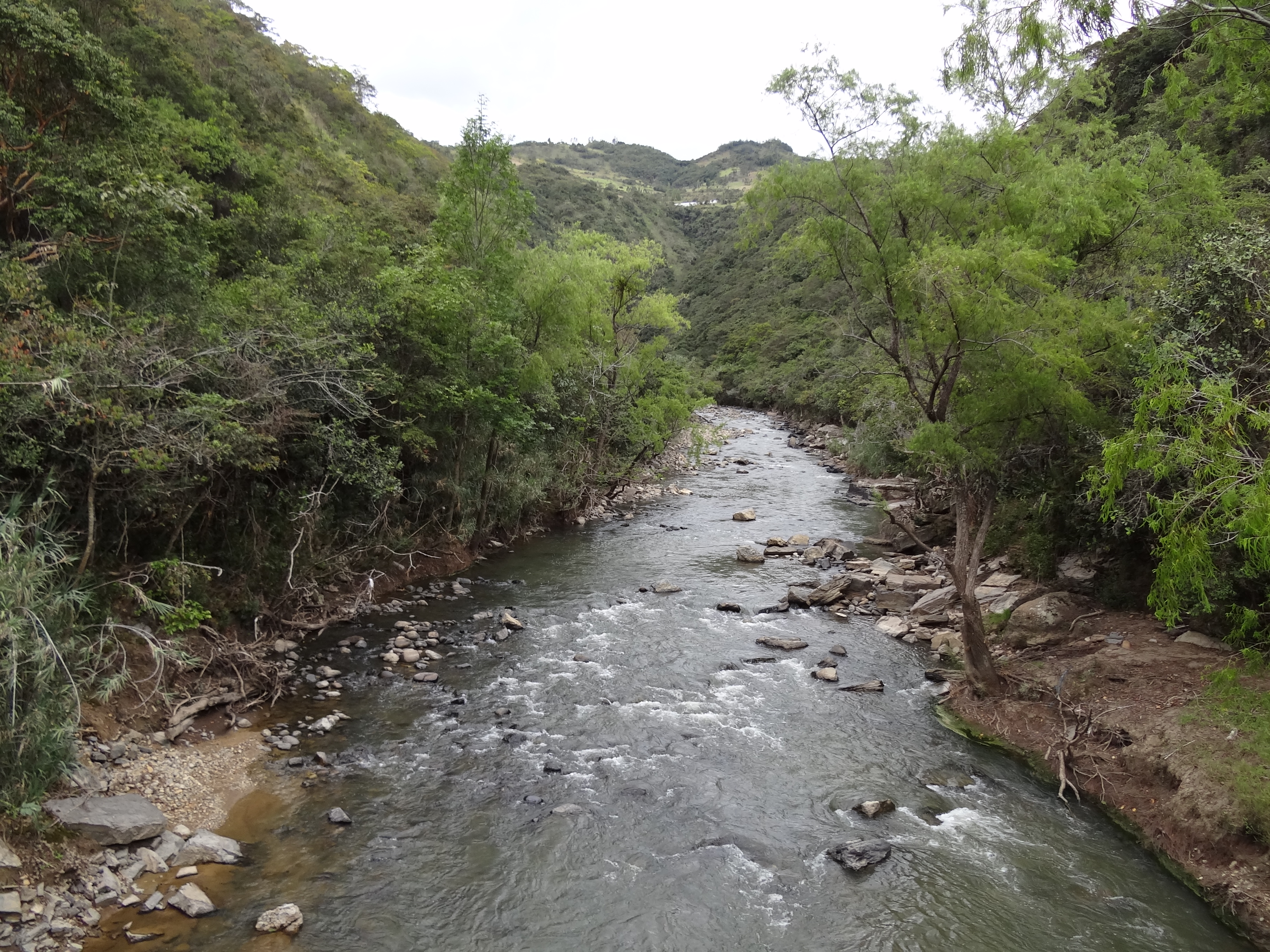
Moniquirá River

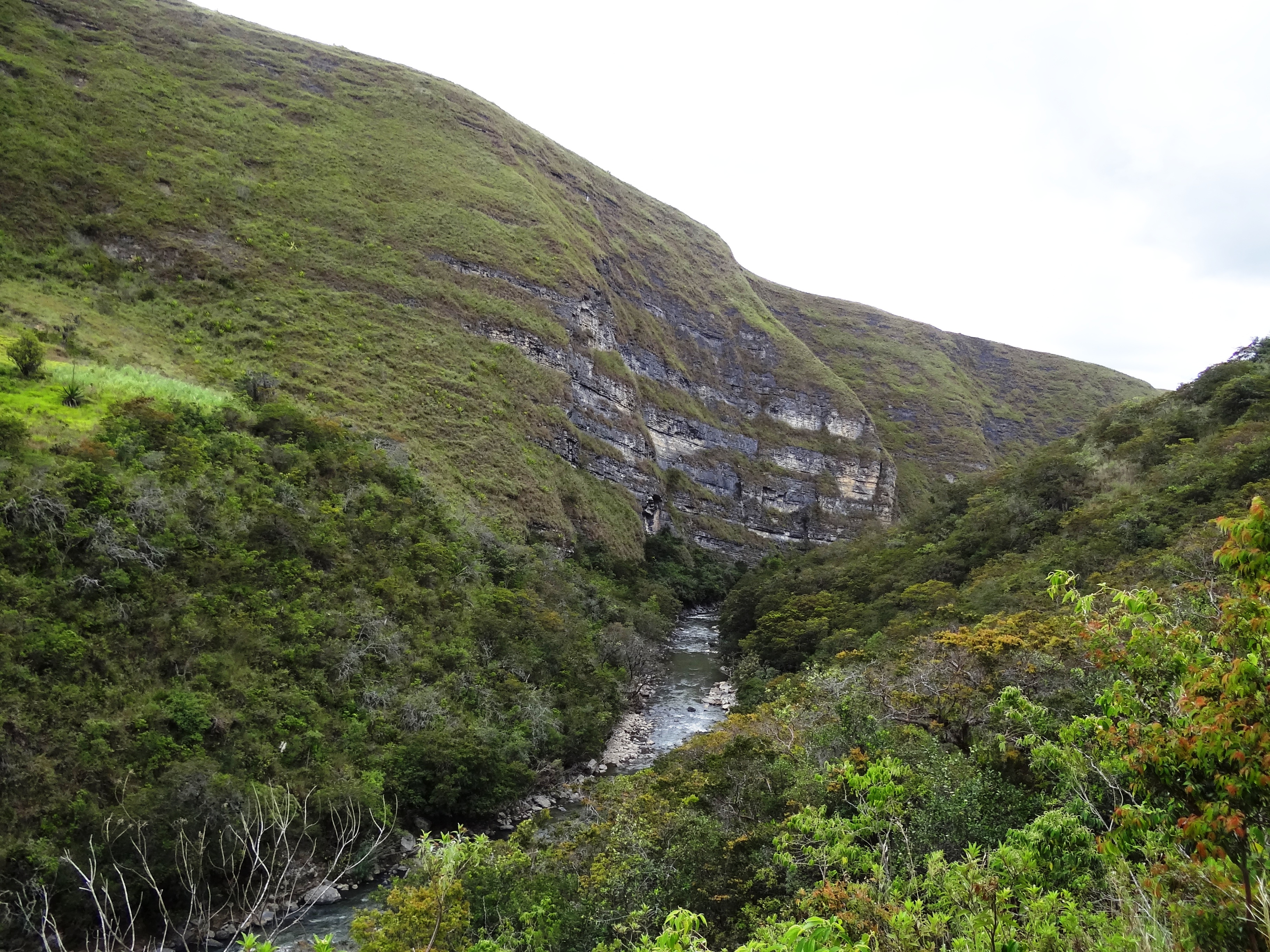
Paso del Ángel

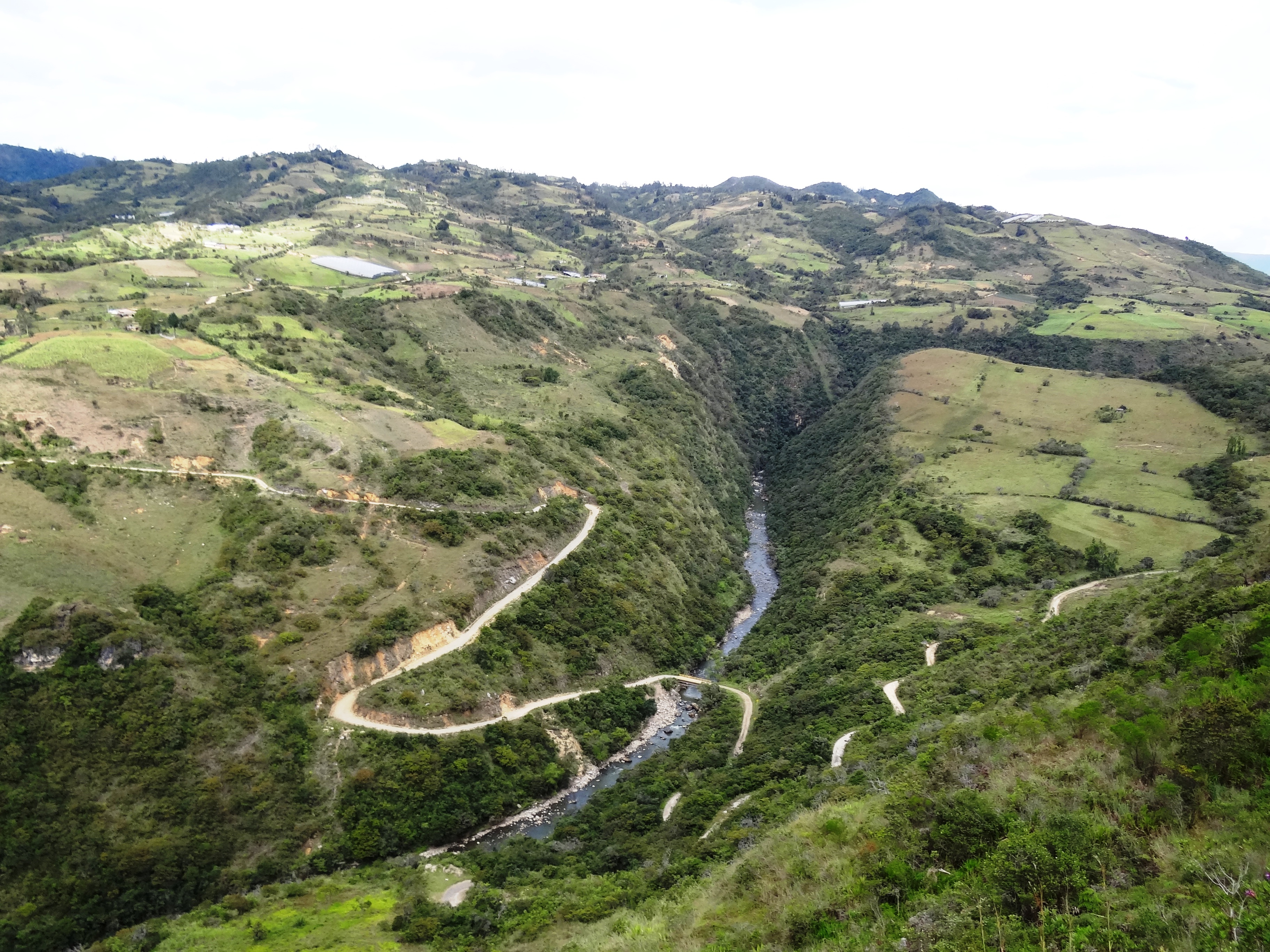
Ancient road, Paso del Ángel

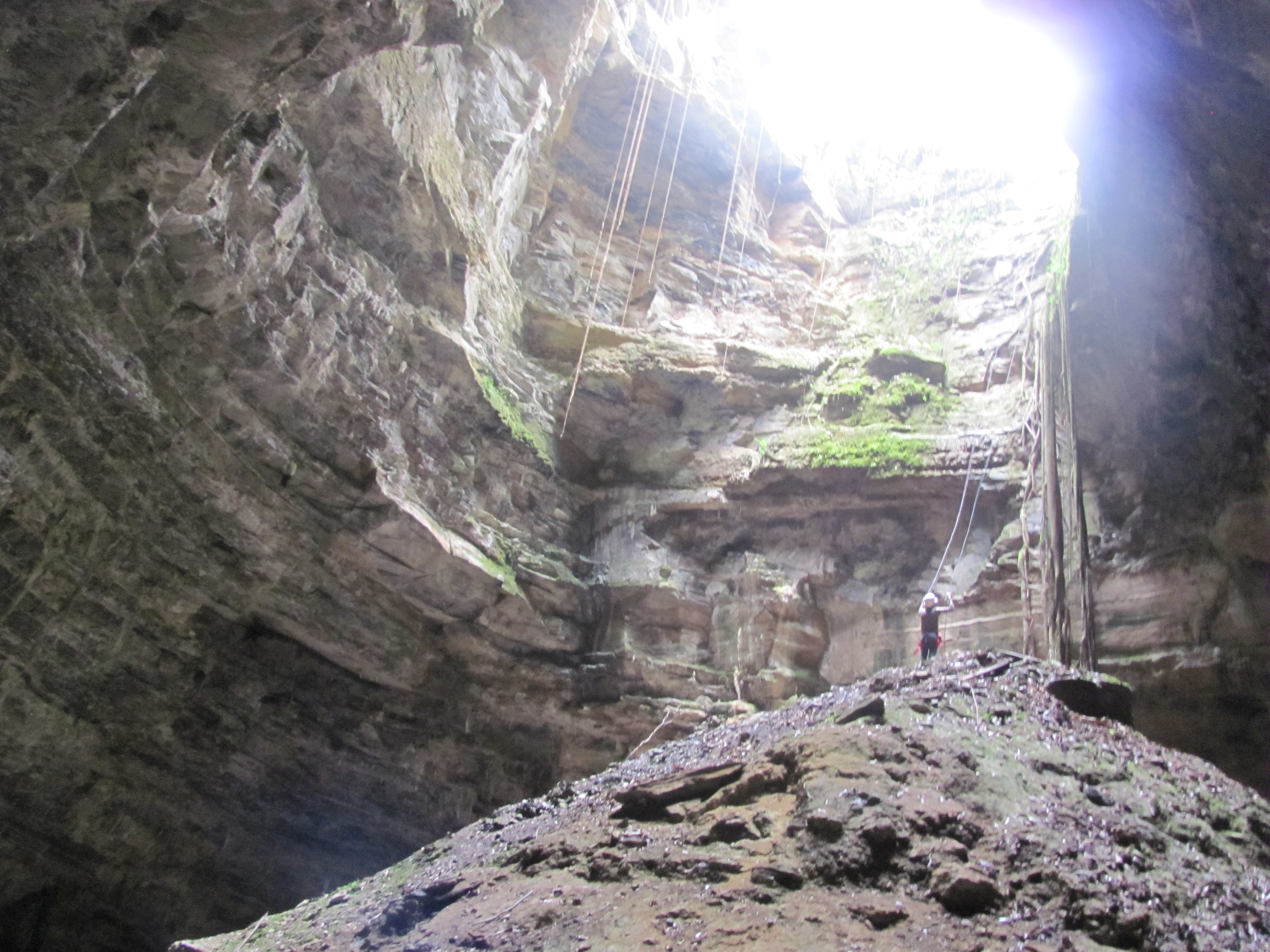
Hoyo de la Romera
