= San José de Pare =

- Municipality and town
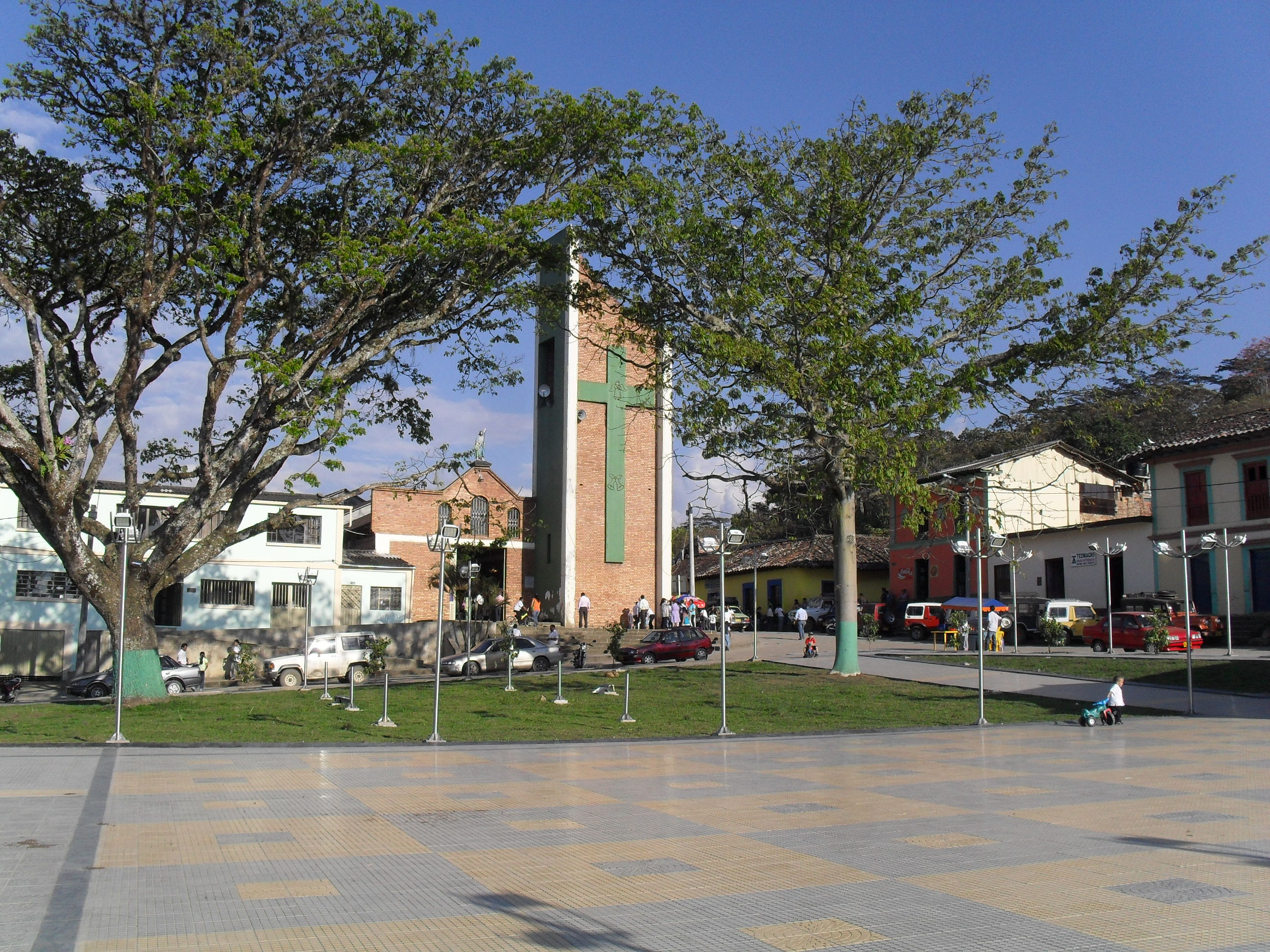
- Central square

- Flag

- Location of the municipality and town of San José de Pare in the Boyacá Department of Colombia
- Coordinates: 6°01′N 73°33′W
- Country: Colombia
- Department: Boyacá Department
- Province: Ricaurte Province
- Founded: 3 November 1780
- Founder: Pedro Antonio Flórez

Government
  - Mayor: Elder Acuña Sánchez (2020-2023)

Area
  - Municipality and town: 73.85 km^{2} (28.51 sq mi)
  - Urban: 0.23 km^{2} (0.089 sq mi)
- Elevation: 1,545 m (5,069 ft)

Population (2015)
  - Municipality and town: 5,221
  - Density: 70.70/km^{2} (183.1/sq mi)
  - Urban: 1,071
- Time zone: UTC-5 (Colombia Standard Time)
- Website: Official website

San José de Pare is a town and municipality in the Ricaurte Province, part of the department of Boyacá, Colombia. The urban centre of San José de Pare is situated at an elevation of 1,545 metres (5,069 ft) in the Eastern Ranges of the Colombian Andes, and the elevation within the municipality ranges from 1,200 to 2,400 metres (3,900 to 7,900 ft). The border between San José de Pare and the department of Santander is formed by the Suárez River. The other municipalities bordering San José de Pare are Chitaraque, Togüí, Moniquirá and Santana. San José de Pare is along the highway from Bogotá to Bucaramanga, at 217 kilometres (135 mi) from the Colombian capital.

== Etymology ==
San José de Pare is named after the Pare indigenous people, who inhabited the area before the Spanish conquest.

== History ==
San José de Pare was founded on November 3, 1780, by Pedro Antonio Flórez, as part of the now defunct Vélez Province. On September 29, 1819, Simón Bolívar passed through the town. In 1857, the department of Boyacá was created and San José de Pare passed over to belong to Boyacá, while the rest of the former province went to become part of Santander.

== Economy ==
Economical activities of San José de Pare are mining, ecotourism and agriculture. Main products cultivated in small farmfields are sugarcane, coffee, beans, maize, bananas and yuca.

== Gallery ==
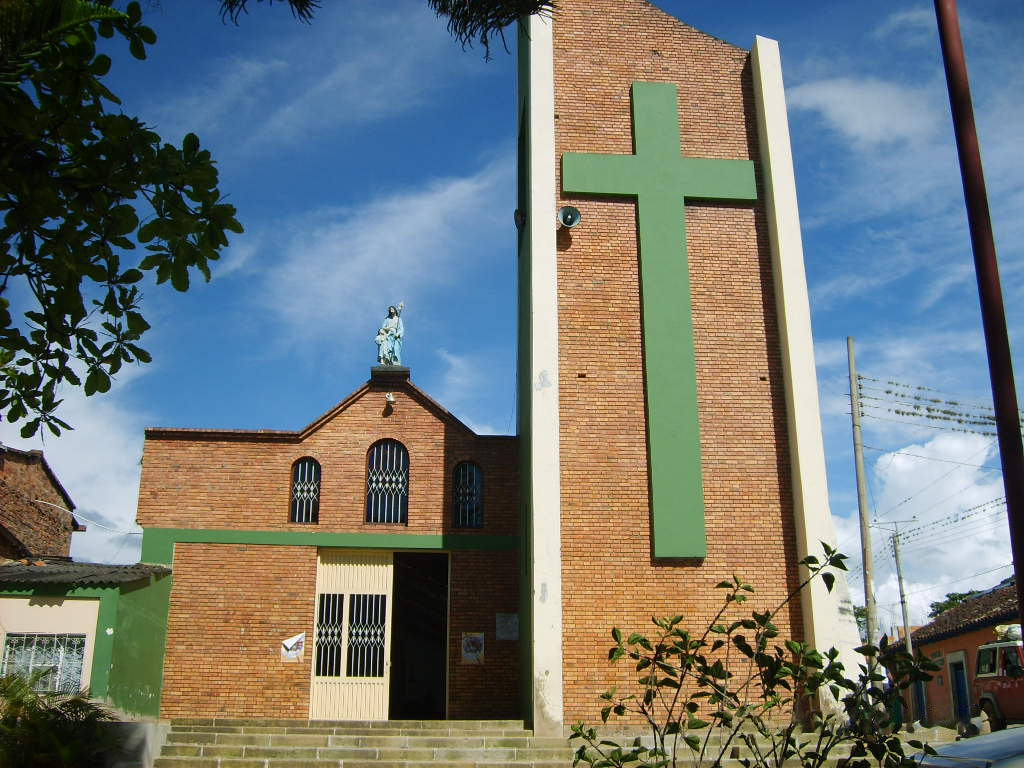
Church

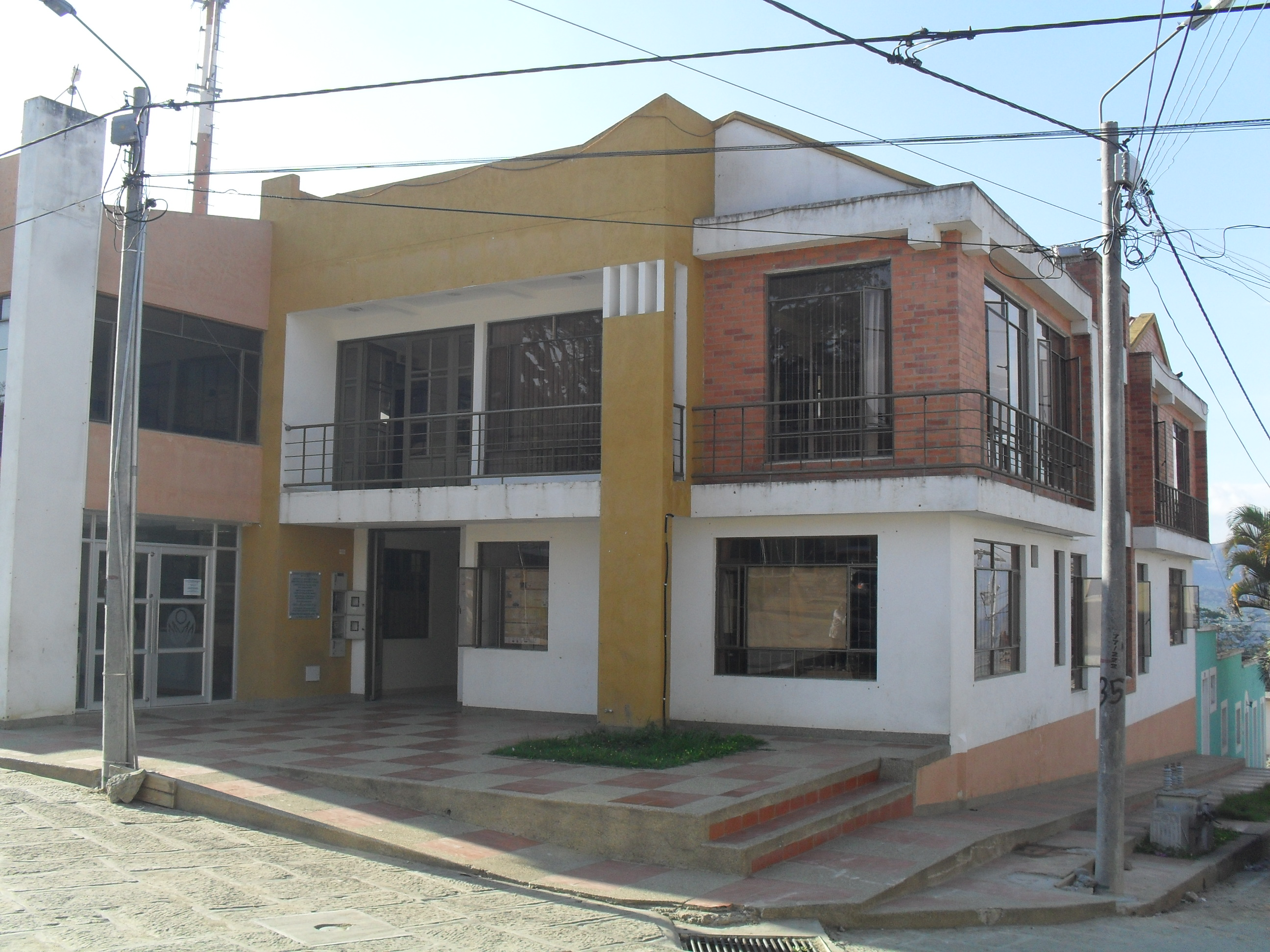
Town council

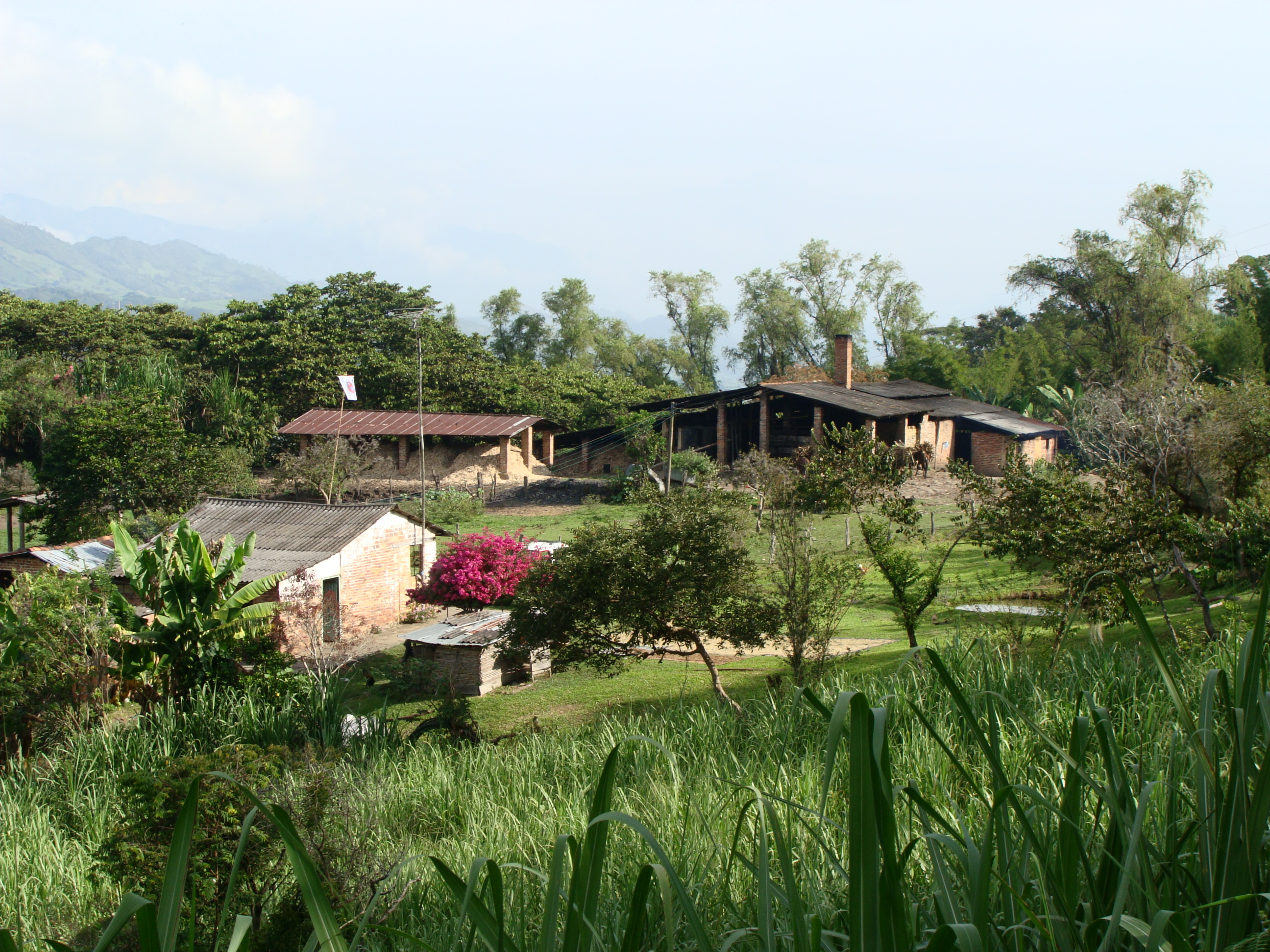
Rural part
