= Santana, Boyacá =

Town and municipality in Boyacá Department, Colombia

Santana Santa Ana de Vélez
- Municipality and town
- Flag

- Location of the municipality and town of Santana in the Boyacá Department of Colombia
- Coordinates: 6°3′26″N 73°28′52″W
- Country: Colombia
- Department: Boyacá Department
- Province: Ricaurte Province
- Founded: 14 June 1806
- Founder: Antonio José Amar y Borbón

Government
  - Mayor: Juan Carlos Sánchez Rincón (2024-2027)

Area
  - Municipality and town: 67 km^{2} (26 sq mi)
- Elevation: 1,550 m (5,090 ft)

Population (2015)
  - Municipality and town: 7,692
  - Density: 110/km^{2} (300/sq mi)
  - Urban: 2,348
- Time zone: UTC-5 (Colombia Standard Time)
- Website: Official website

Santana is a town and municipality in the Ricaurte Province, in the north of the Colombian department of Boyacá. The urban centre is situated at an altitude of 1,550 metres (5,090 ft) in the Eastern Ranges of the Colombian Andes. Santana borders Chitaraque and the Santander Department in the east, Güepsa, Santander in the west, Suaita, Santander in the north and Chitaraque and San José de Pare in the south.

== Etymology ==
Santana was called Santa Ana de Vélez until the end of the nineteenth century. Later, it was shortened to Santana.

== History ==
The region of Santana, before the Spanish conquest of the Muisca, was an important cotton-growing area. The Guane and through trade also the Muisca, made mantles and small cloths used as money from the plant. Santana was located between the terrains led by the major cacique of Vélez and Chitaraque. Conquistador Martín Galeano founded the modern town of Vélez on June 3, 1539. Santa Ana was visited by evangelisers at the end of 1692 for the first time, 75 years after the installation of the encomienda of Santa Ana de Vélez. Modern Santana, then still called Santa Ana, was founded by viceroy Antonio José Amar y Borbón on June 14, 1806.

== Economy ==
The basis for the economy of Santana is the cultivation of sugarcane, to produce panela. ⁣⁣Coffee⁣⁣ is also grown in Santana.

== Gallery ==
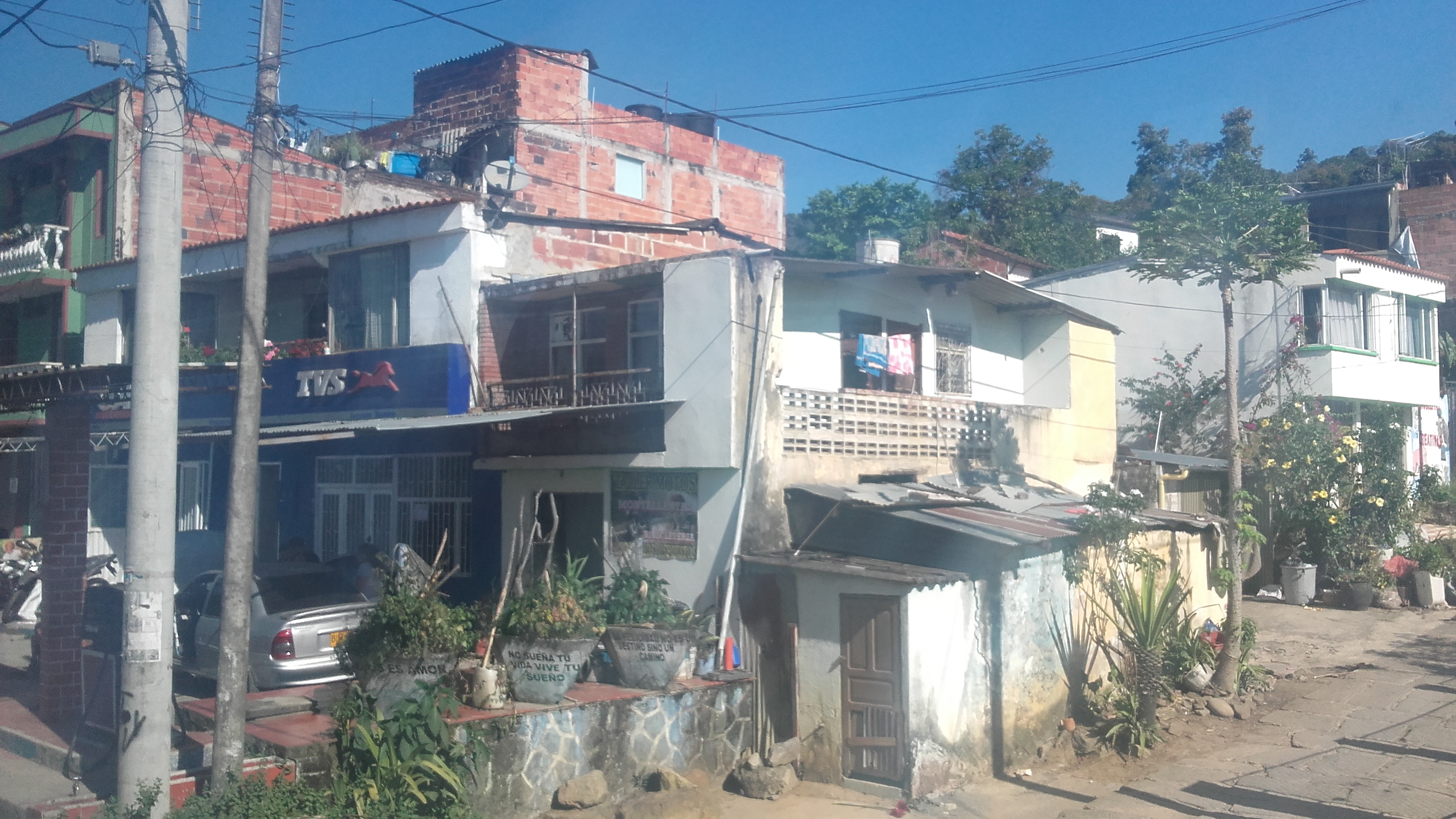
A building in Santana (2017)

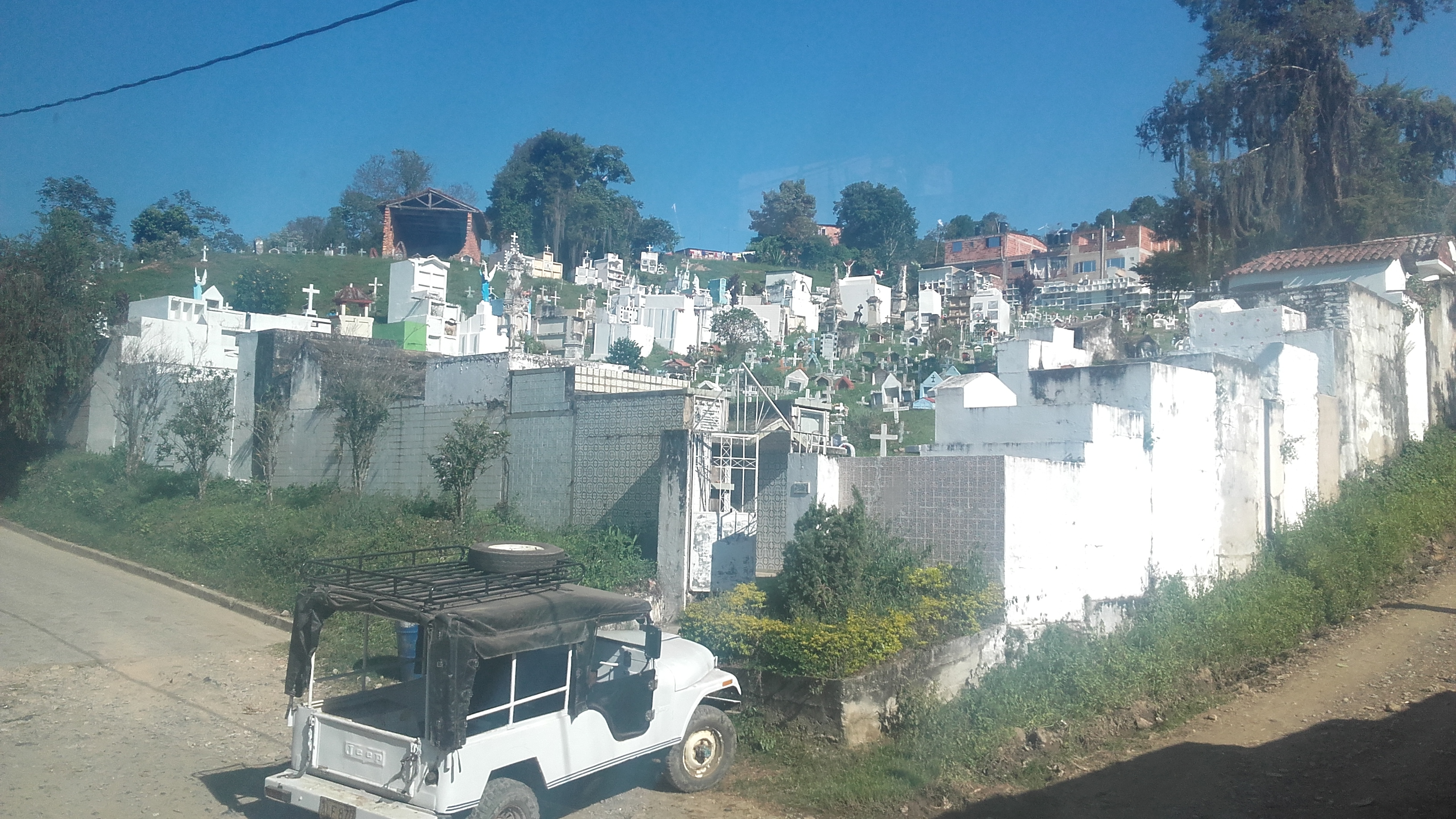
Local cemetery in Santana (2017)
