= Gachantivá =

Coordinates: 5°45′N 73°30′W

- Municipality and town
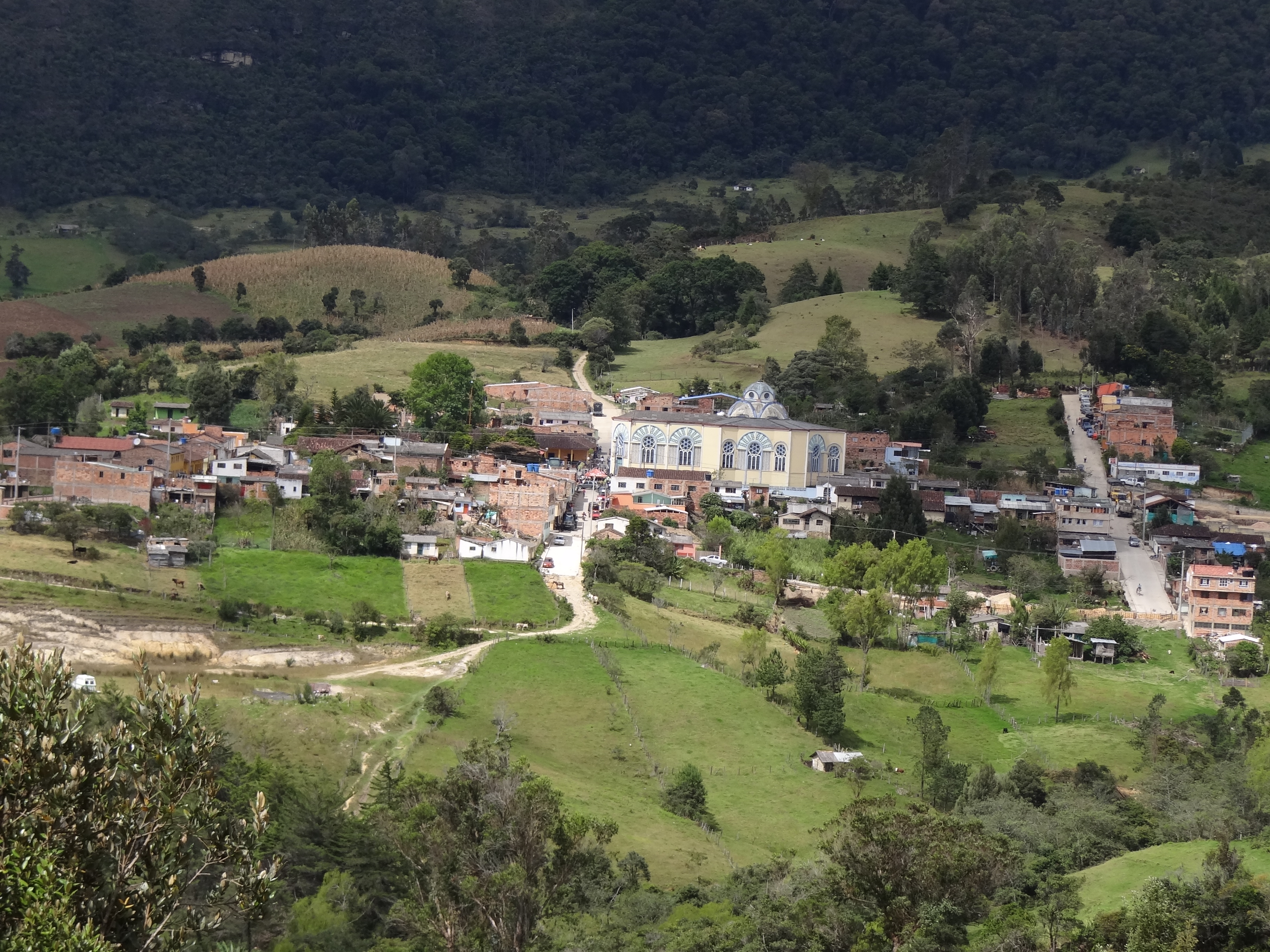
- View of Gachantivá

- Flag

- Location of the municipality and town of Gachantivá in the Boyacá department of Colombia
- Country: Colombia
- Department: Boyacá Department
- Province: Ricaurte Province
- Founded: 1715
- Founder: Juan José Neira

Government
  - Mayor: Pedro Alonso Aguillón Puentes (2020-2023)

Area
  - Municipality and town: 66 km^{2} (25 sq mi)
- Elevation: 2,450 m (8,040 ft)

Population (2015)
  - Municipality and town: 2,654
  - Density: 40/km^{2} (100/sq mi)
  - Urban: 364
- Time zone: UTC-5 (Colombia Standard Time)
- Website: Official website

Gachantivá is a town and municipality in the Ricaurte Province, part of the Colombian department of Boyacá. Gachantivá is located at altitudes ranging from 2,000 metres (6,600 ft) to 3,300 metres (10,800 ft) on the Altiplano Cundiboyacense and borders Villa de Leyva in the south, Santa Sofía in the west, Arcabuco in the east and Moniquirá in the north.

== Etymology ==
The name Gachantivá comes from Chibcha and means "chief of the Gacha".

== History ==
The area of Gachantivá before the Spanish conquest was inhabited by the Muisca, organised in their loose Muisca Confederation. The cacique of Gachantivá was loyal to the zaque of Hunza.

Modern Gachantivá was founded in 1715 by Juan José Neira.

== Economy ==
The main economical activities of Gachantivá are agriculture and livestock farming. Among the agricultural products cultivated are maize, potatoes, yuca, coffee, blackberries, beans and peas.

== Gallery ==
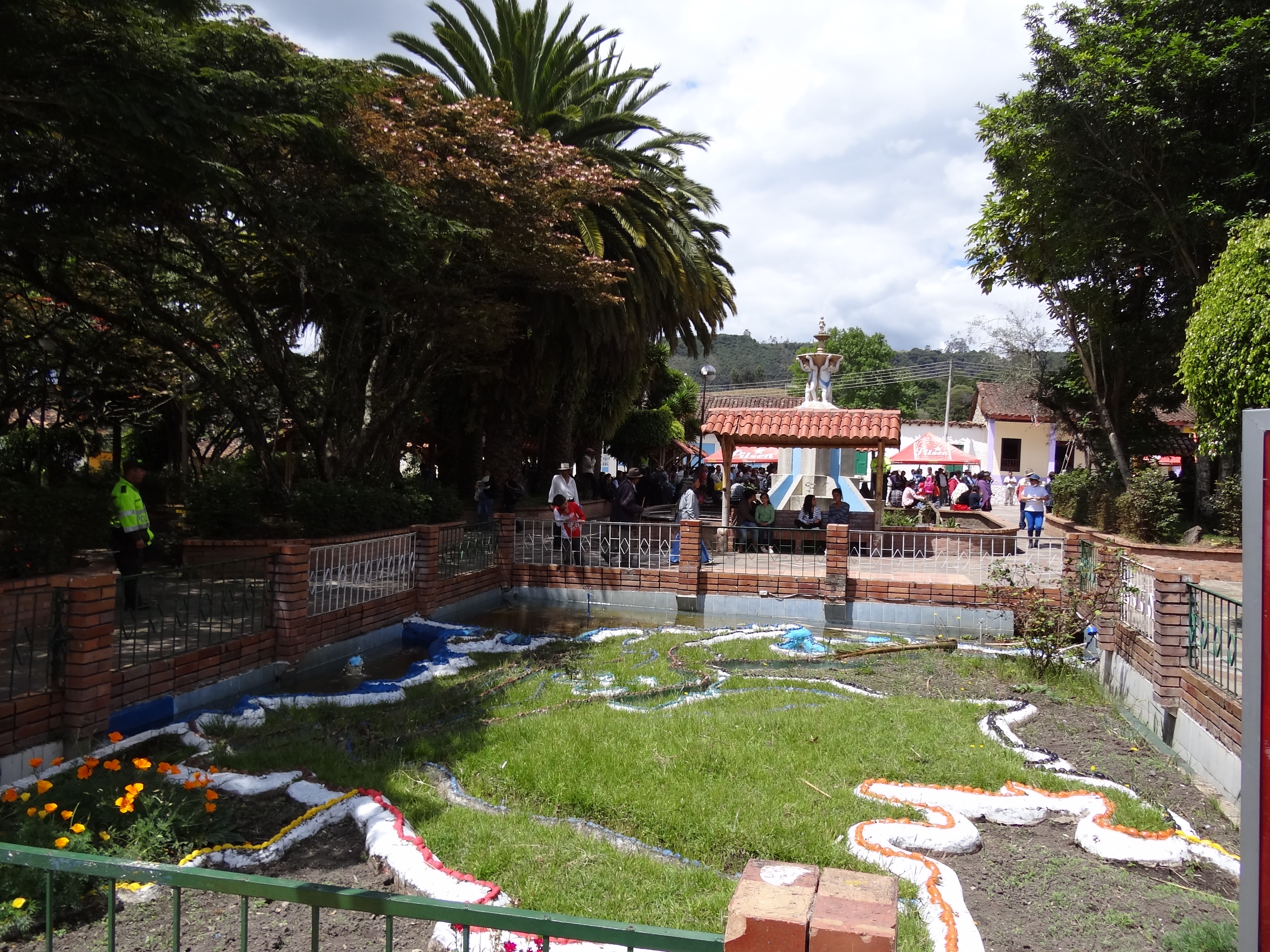
Central park

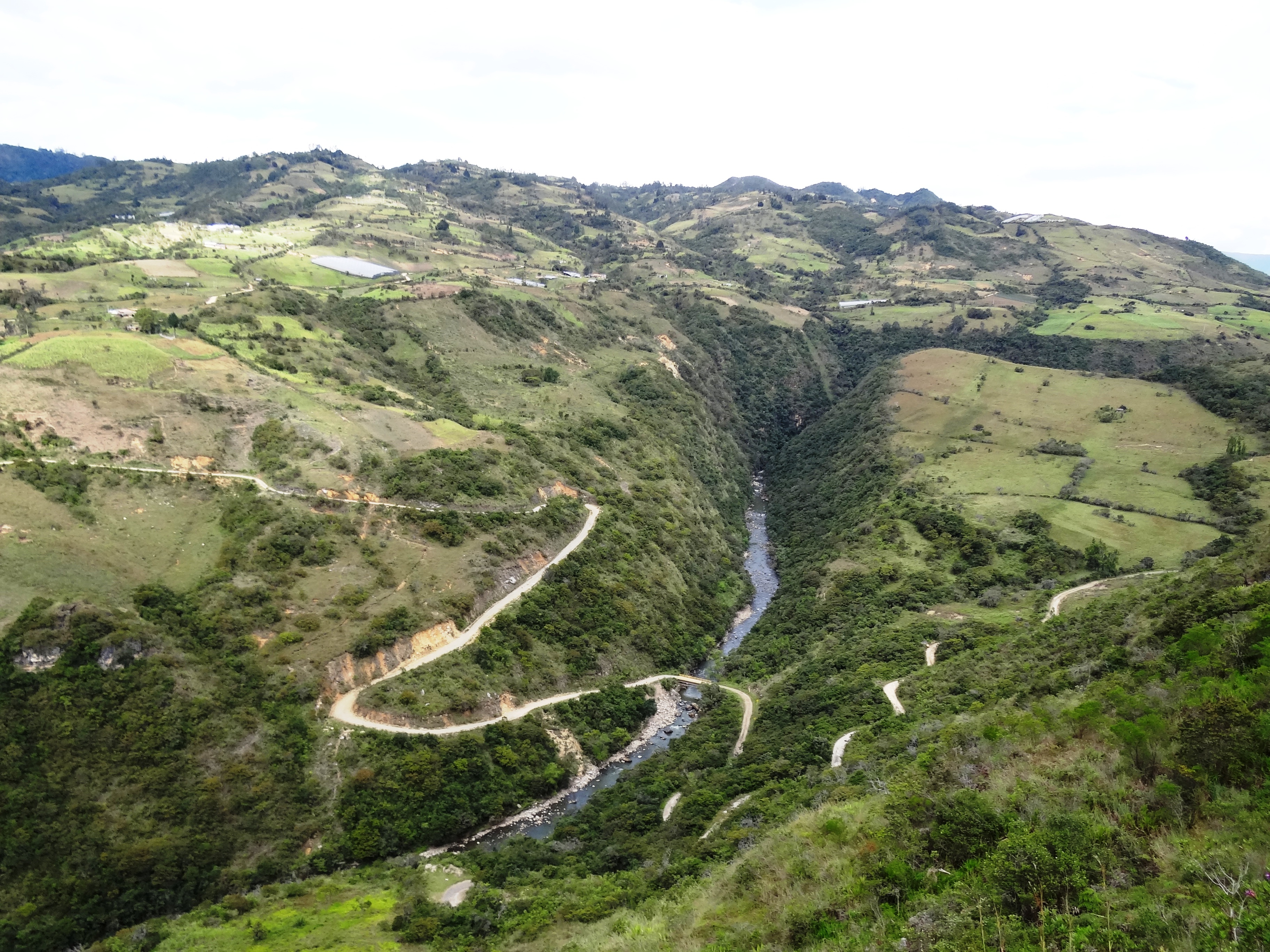
Road to Paso del Ángel

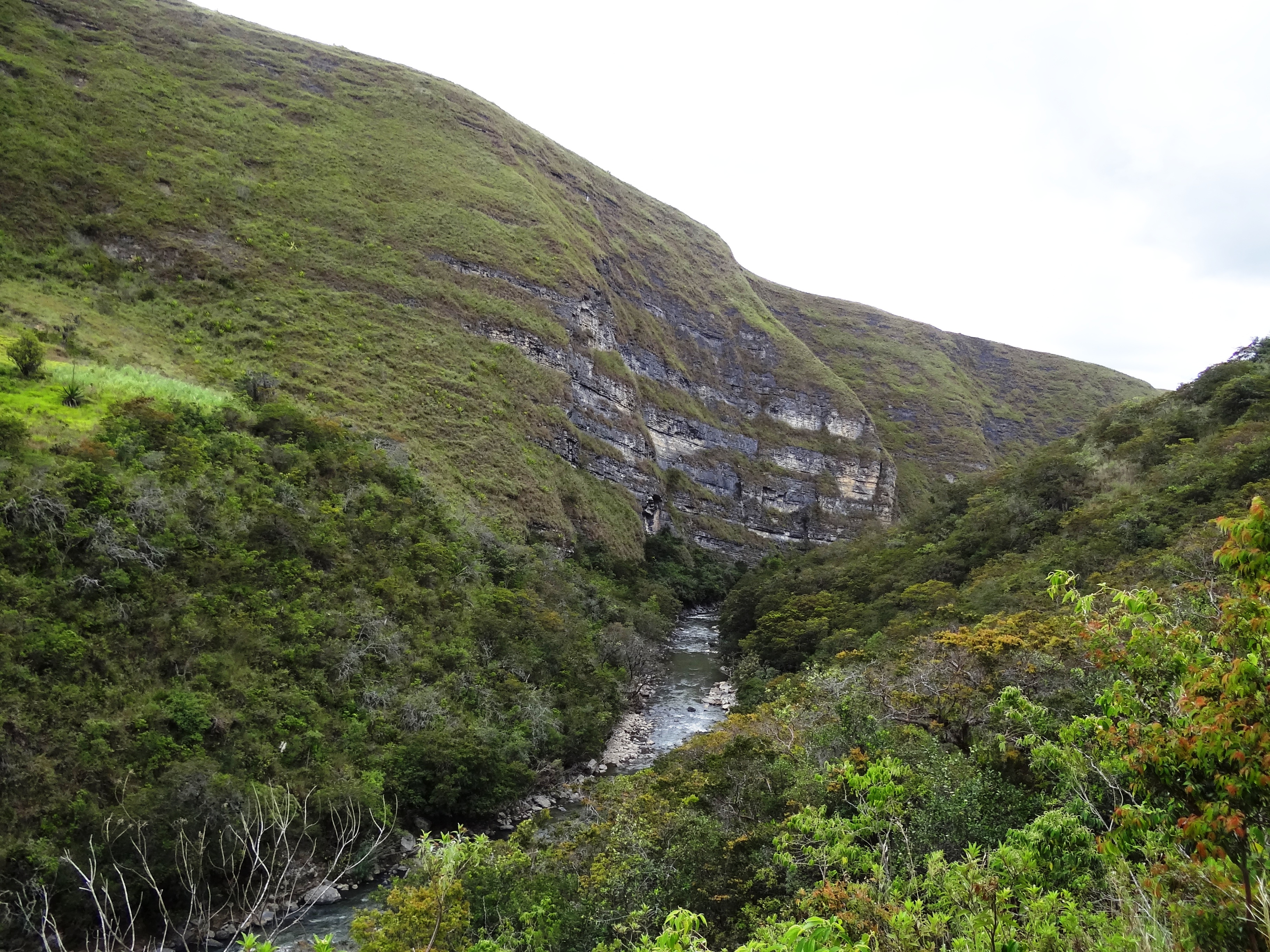
Paso del Ángel mountain

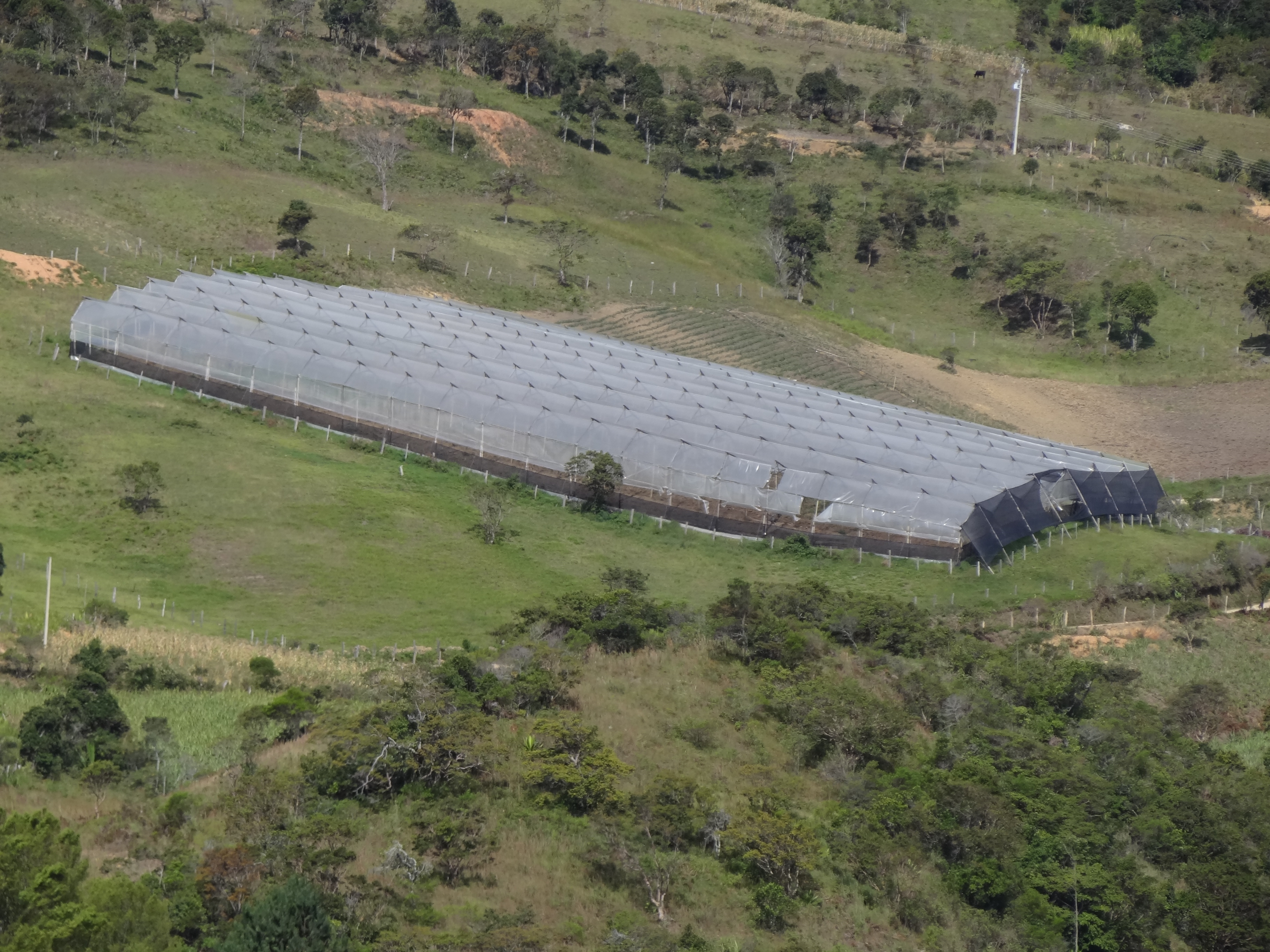
Greenhouse in Gachantivá
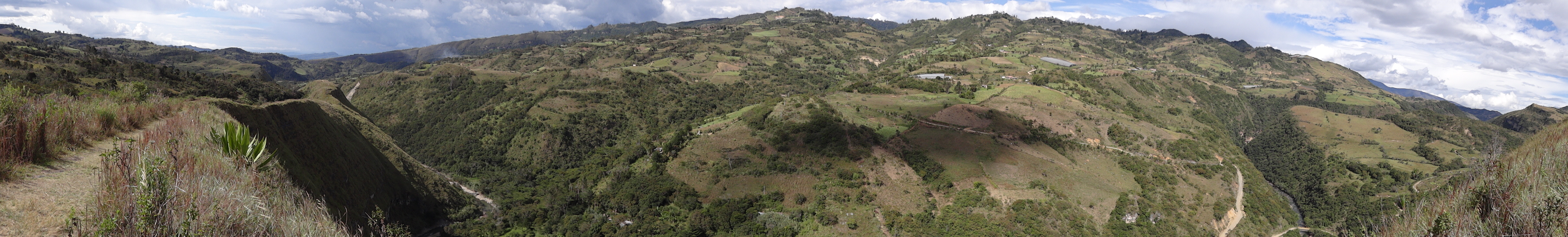
Panorama of the rural areas of Santa Sofía and Gachantivá
