= Gámbita =

Coordinates: 6°00′N 73°15′W

- Municipality and town
- Flag Coat of arms

- Location of the municipality and town of Gámbita in the Santander Department of Colombia
- Country: Colombia
- Department: Santander Department
- Time zone: UTC-5 (Colombia Standard Time)

Gámbita is a municipality in the department of Santander, Colombia, is part of the Comunera province. The municipality has a land area of 606.1 km2 and is formed by the corresponding municipal seat to the urban area, 20 villages and district of La Palma.

== Geography ==
Gámbita has a natural heritage and landscape that offers ecosystem services such as sources of water and oxygen, uptake of carbon dioxide, and resources for flora and wildlife. These are intended to support quality of life, environmental sustainability and economic development in the medium and long term. Activities are developed in accordance with land use restrictions, accompanied by training in environmental, social and economic resources and technology transfer for cleaner production, in order to reach niche markets for products derived from sugarcane, fruits and vegetables.

Likewise, the livestock, the bee culture and farming are production alternatives with high environmental and economic viability level in the municipality.

=== Climate ===
Gámbita has a subtropical highland climate, close to a tropical rainforest climate according to the Köppen climate classification system. Gámbita has a rainy and consistently warm climate.

Climate data for Gámbita, elevation 1,900 m (6,200 ft), (1981–2010)
Month	Jan	Feb	Mar	Apr	May	Jun	Jul	Aug	Sep	Oct	Nov	Dec	Year
Mean daily maximum °C (°F)	23.4 (74.1)	23.4 (74.1)	23.4 (74.1)	23.2 (73.8)	23.1 (73.6)	23.1 (73.6)	23.2 (73.8)	23.3 (73.9)	23.3 (73.9)	23.0 (73.4)	23.0 (73.4)	22.9 (73.2)	23.2 (73.8)
Daily mean °C (°F)	18.0 (64.4)	18.0 (64.4)	18.2 (64.8)	18.2 (64.8)	18.2 (64.8)	18.2 (64.8)	18.0 (64.4)	18.0 (64.4)	18.0 (64.4)	17.9 (64.2)	18.0 (64.4)	17.9 (64.2)	18.1 (64.6)
Mean daily minimum °C (°F)	12.4 (54.3)	12.5 (54.5)	12.8 (55.0)	13.1 (55.6)	13.1 (55.6)	12.8 (55.0)	12.2 (54.0)	12.2 (54.0)	12.4 (54.3)	12.7 (54.9)	13.0 (55.4)	12.6 (54.7)	12.7 (54.9)
Average precipitation mm (inches)	122.3 (4.81)	140.6 (5.54)	206.4 (8.13)	293.9 (11.57)	302.7 (11.92)	167.3 (6.59)	141.6 (5.57)	166.8 (6.57)	206.6 (8.13)	314.9 (12.40)	270.6 (10.65)	160.9 (6.33)	2,446.5 (96.32)
Average precipitation days	12.5	14.2	20.0	22.4	22.4	15.5	14.0	14.0	16.3	21.3	21.4	16.1	210.1
Average relative humidity (%)	82	82	82	84	84	84	83	83	82	83	83	83	83
Source: Instituto de Hidrologia Meteorologia y Estudios Ambientales

== Personalities ==
- Luis Antonio Calvo (1882 - 1945) Composer
