= Hirtudiscus boyacensis =

Scientific classification
- Kingdom: Animalia
- Phylum: Mollusca
- Class: Gastropoda
- Order: Stylommatophora
- Suborder: Scolodontina
- Family: Scolodontidae
- Genus: Hirtudiscus
- Species: H. boyacensis

Binomial name
- Hirtudiscus boyacensis Hausdorf, 2003

Species of gastropod

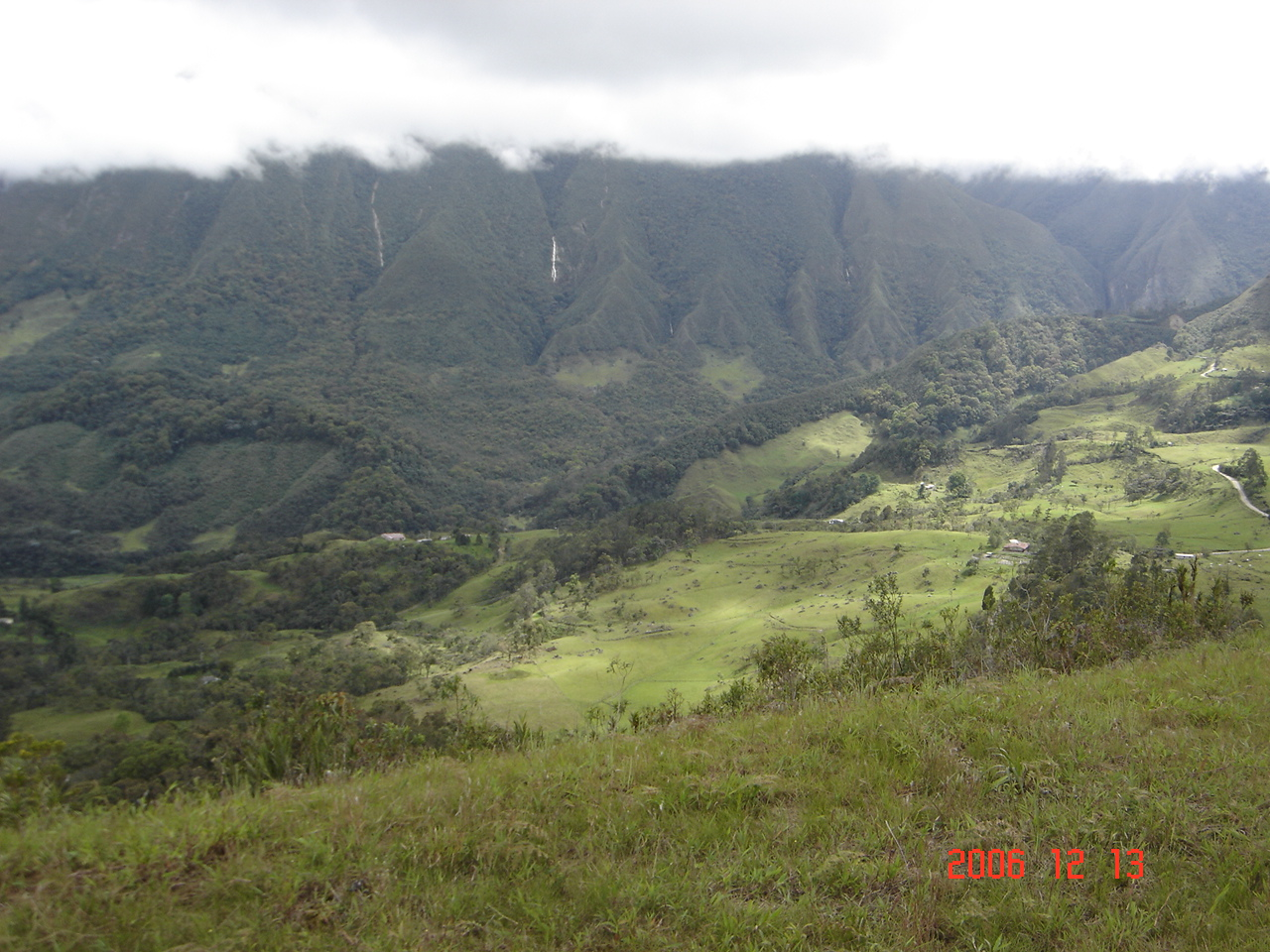
Typical landscape of the Altiplano Cundiboyacense (Arcabuco) habitat of Hirtudiscus boyacensis

Hirtudiscus boyacensis is a species of land snail in the subfamily of Scolodontinae of the family Scolodontidae, first described by Bernhard Hausdorf in 2003.

== Etymology and habitat ==
Hirtudiscus boyacensis has been named after the Colombian department Boyacá where the species has been found. The holotype was discovered in a dry forest at 2,170 metres (7,120 ft) altitude between Villa de Leyva and Gachantivá. Paratypes were found at 2,400 metres (7,900 ft) towards Arcabuco in an oak forest, in Moniquirá at 2,500 metres (8,200 ft), 2,400 metres (7,900 ft) and 2,150 metres (7,050 ft) and in Barbosa at 1,840 metres (6,040 ft).

== Description ==
The morphology of Hirtudiscus boyacensis is described by Hausdorf; a disc-like shell with convex whorls, a protoconch with more or less distinct spiral striae and dense growth striae and hairs. The shell diameter is 3.5-5.2 mm.

The specimens from the surroundings of Barbosa and Moniquira differ from those from near Villa de Leyva in the smaller shell with more strongly arched whorls, a weaker spiral sculpture on the protoconch and an umbilicus that is on average narrower.
