= Probythinella protera =

Scientific classification
- Kingdom: Animalia
- Phylum: Mollusca
- Class: Gastropoda
- Order: Stylommatophora
- Suborder: Scolodontina
- Family: Scolodontidae
- Genus: Probythinella
- Species: P. protera

Binomial name
- Probythinella protera Pilsbry, 1953

Species of gastropod

Probythinella protera is a species of very small aquatic snail, an operculate gastropod mollusk in the family Hydrobiidae.

== Distribution ==
- Gulf of Mexico

== Description ==
The maximum recorded shell length is 3.6 mm.

== Habitat ==
Minimum recorded depth is 0 m. Maximum recorded depth is 2 m.
