= Probythinella =

Scientific classification
- Kingdom: Animalia
- Phylum: Mollusca
- Class: Gastropoda
- Order: Stylommatophora
- Suborder: Scolodontina
- Family: Scolodontidae
- Genus: Probythinella; Thiele, 1928

Genus of gastropods

Probythinella is a genus of very small aquatic snails, operculate gastropod mollusks in the family Hydrobiidae.

== Species ==
Species within the genus Probythinella include:

- Probythinella protera Pilsbry, 1953
