= Hirtudiscus =

Scientific classification
- Domain: Eukaryota
- Kingdom: Animalia
- Phylum: Mollusca
- Class: Gastropoda
- Order: Stylommatophora
- Suborder: Scolodontina
- Family: Scolodontidae
- Genus: Hirtudiscus; Hylton Scott, 1973

Genus of land snails

Hirtudiscus is a genus of gastropods belonging to the family Scolodontidae.

The species of this genus are found in Southern America.

Species:

- Hirtudiscus antioquiensis Hausdorf & Medina Bermúdez, 2006
- Hirtudiscus boyacensis Hausdorf, 2003
- Hirtudiscus comatus Hausdorf, 2003
- Hirtudiscus curei Hausdorf, 2003
- Hirtudiscus hirtus Hylton Scott, 1973
- Hirtudiscus triserialis Hausdorf & Medina Bermúdez, 2006
