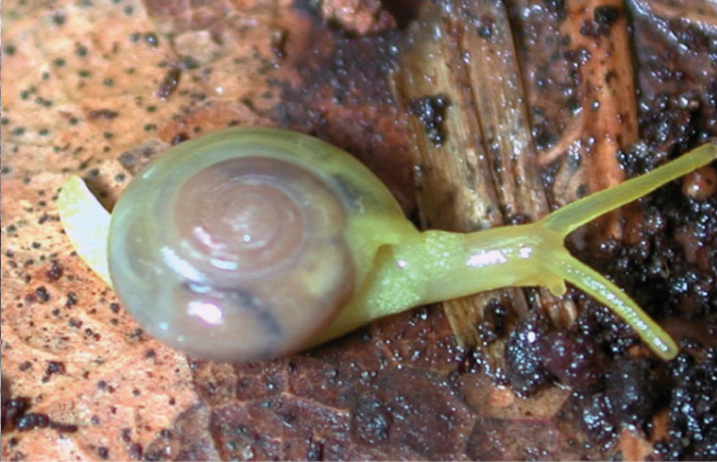
- A live individual of Tamayoa decolorata

Scientific classification
- Kingdom: Animalia
- Phylum: Mollusca
- Class: Gastropoda
- Order: Stylommatophora
- Suborder: Scolodontina
- Family: Scolodontidae
- Genus: Tamayoa
- Species: T. decolorata

Binomial name
- Tamayoa decolorata (Drouët, 1859)

= Tamayoa decolorata =

Species of gastropod

Tamayoa decolorata is a species of air-breathing land snail, a terrestrial pulmonate gastropod mollusk in the family Scolodontidae.

== Distribution ==
The distribution of Tamayoa decolorata includes:

- Jamaica
- Guadeloupe
- Dominica This species is probably an introduced one in Dominica, as it was found only in disturbed habitats.
- Martinique
- Barbados
- Saint Vincent
- Tobago
- Trinidad
- French Guiana
- Brazil
