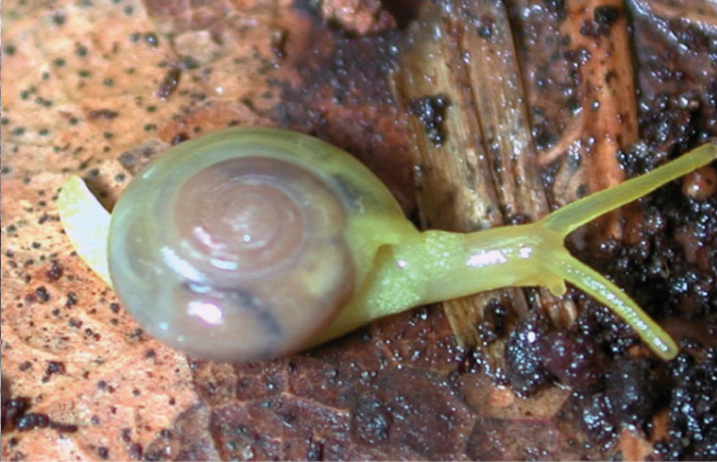
- A live individual of Tamayoa decolorata

Scientific classification
- Kingdom: Animalia
- Phylum: Mollusca
- Class: Gastropoda
- Order: Stylommatophora
- Suborder: Scolodontina
- Family: Scolodontidae
- Genus: Tamayoa; H. B. Baker, 1925

= Tamayoa =

Genus of gastropods

Tamayoa is a genus of air-breathing land snails, terrestrial pulmonate gastropod mollusks in the family Scolodontidae.

Tamayoa is the type genus of the subfamily Tamayoinae.

== Species ==
Species within the genus Tamayoa include:

- Tamayoa banghaasi Thiele - synonym: Happia banghaasi
- Tamayoa decolorata (Drouët, 1859)
- Tamayoa venezuelensis H. B. Baker
