= Scolodonta =

Scientific classification
- Domain: Eukaryota
- Kingdom: Animalia
- Phylum: Mollusca
- Class: Gastropoda
- Order: Stylommatophora
- Suborder: Scolodontina
- Family: Scolodontidae
- Genus: Scolodonta; Doering, 1875

Genus of gastropods

Scolodonta is a genus of air-breathing land snails, terrestrial pulmonate gastropod mollusks in the family Scolodontidae.

Scolodonta is the type genus of the family Scolodontidae.

This genus is sometimes classified within the Streptaxidae.

== Distribution ==
The distribution of the genus Scolodonta includes:

- Argentina
- Brazil

== Description ==
The anatomy of Scolodonta is currently unknown.

== Species ==
Species within the genus Scolodonta include:

- Scolodonta amazonica (Dohrn, 1882)
- Scolodonta bounoboena (d’Orbigny, 1835)
- Scolodonta interrupta (Suter, 1900)
- Scolodonta mutata (Gould, 1846)
- Scolodonta nitidula (Dohrn, 1882)
- Scolodonta spirorbis (Deshayes, 1850)
