= 2012 Critérium du Dauphiné =

2012 UCI World Tour, race 16 of 28
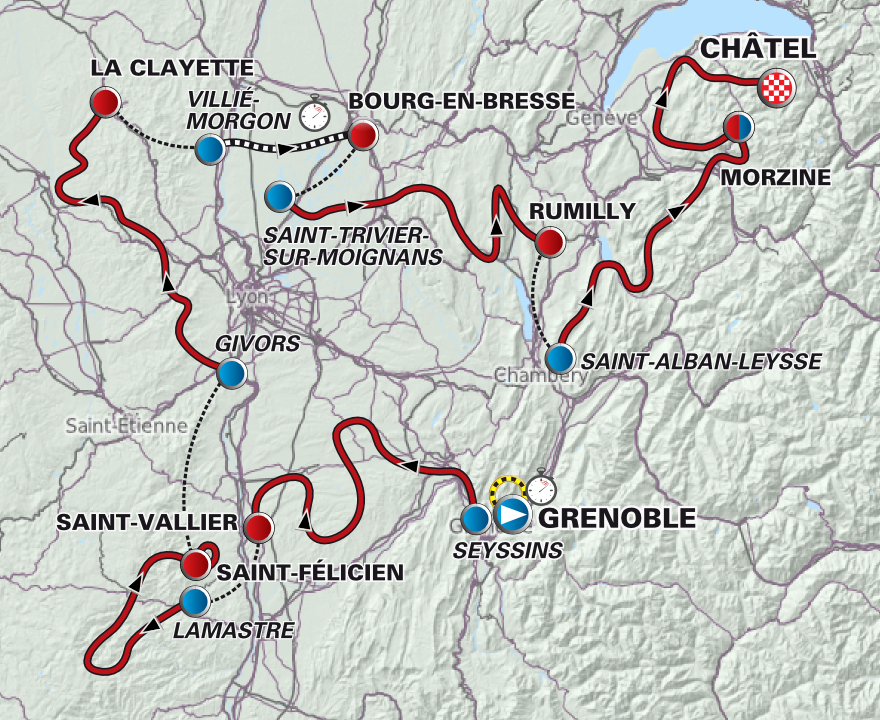
- The route of the 2012 Critérium du Dauphiné

Race details
- Dates: 3–10 June 2012
- Stages: 7 + Prologue
- Distance: 1,051.7 km (653.5 mi)
- Winning time: 26h 40' 46"

Results
Jersey awarded to the overall winner	Winner	Bradley Wiggins (Great Britain)	(Team Sky)
	Second	Michael Rogers (Australia)	(Team Sky)
	Third	Cadel Evans (Australia)	(BMC Racing Team)
Jersey awarded to the points classification winner	Points	Cadel Evans (Australia)	(BMC Racing Team)
Jersey awarded to the mountains classification winner	Mountains	Cayetano Sarmiento (Colombia)	(Liquigas–Cannondale)
Jersey awarded to the young rider classification winner	Young rider	Wilco Kelderman (Netherlands)	(Rabobank)
	Team	Team Sky	

The 2012 Critérium du Dauphiné was the 64th running of the Critérium du Dauphiné cycling stage race; a race rated as a World Tour event on the UCI calendar, the highest classification such an event can have. The race consisted of eight stages, beginning with a prologue in Grenoble on 3 June, and concluded in Châtel on 10 June. The race was organised by the Amaury Sport Organisation, the same group that organises the Tour de France. It was viewed as a great preparation for July's Tour de France, hence why a majority of the contenders for the general classification of the major tour participated in the Dauphiné. It featured mountainous stages as well as an individual time trial quite similar in length to those that awaited the riders in the Tour.

The race was won for the second successive year by Team Sky rider Bradley Wiggins, who claimed the leader's yellow and blue jersey after the first stage, extending his race-leading advantage after winning the fourth stage individual time trial, and ultimately maintained that advantage. Wiggins became only the third rider to win the Dauphiné and Paris–Nice – a race that Wiggins had won in March – in the same year after Jacques Anquetil (1963 and 1965) and Eddy Merckx (1971) had previously done so.

Wiggins' winning margin over his team-mate and runner-up Michael Rogers was one minute and seventeen seconds, and BMC Racing Team's Cadel Evans completed the podium, nine seconds down on Rogers. In the race's other classifications, Liquigas–Cannondale rider Cayetano Sarmiento won the King of the Mountains classification, Evans won the green jersey for the points classification, Rabobank's Wilco Kelderman won the young rider classification, with Team Sky finishing at the head of the teams classification by over thirteen minutes, after placing four riders inside the final overall top ten placings.

== Participating teams ==
As the Critérium du Dauphiné was a UCI World Tour event, all eighteen UCI ProTeams were invited automatically and obligated to send a squad. Four other squads were given wildcard places into the race, and as such, formed the event's 22-team peloton. All twenty-two squads that competed in the Dauphiné contested the Tour de France later in the year.

The twenty-two teams that competed in the race were:

- Ag2r–La Mondiale
- Argos–Shimano
- Astana
- BMC Racing Team
- Cofidis
- Team Europcar
- Euskaltel–Euskadi
- FDJ–BigMat
- Garmin–Barracuda
- Team Katusha
- Lampre–ISD
- Liquigas–Cannondale
- Lotto–Belisol
- Movistar Team
- Omega Pharma–Quick-Step
- Orica–GreenEDGE
- Rabobank
- RadioShack–Nissan
- Saur–Sojasun
- Team Saxo Bank
- Team Sky
- Vacansoleil–DCM

== Schedule ==
The route for the race was announced on 27 March 2012.

Stage	Route	Distance	Type	Date	Winner
P	Grenoble	5.7 km (3.5 mi)	Individual time trial	3 June	Luke Durbridge (AUS)
1	Seyssins to Saint-Vallier	187 km (116.2 mi)	Intermediate stage	4 June	Cadel Evans (AUS)
2	Lamastre to Saint-Félicien	160 km (99.4 mi)	Mountain stage	5 June	Daniel Moreno (ESP)
3	Givors to La Clayette	167 km (103.8 mi)	Intermediate stage	6 June	Edvald Boasson Hagen (NOR)
4	Villié-Morgon to Bourg-en-Bresse	53.5 km (33.2 mi)	Individual time trial	7 June	Bradley Wiggins (GBR)
5	Saint-Trivier-sur-Moignans to Rumilly	186.5 km (115.9 mi)	Mountain stage	8 June	Arthur Vichot (FRA)
6	Saint-Alban-Leysse to Morzine	167.5 km (104.1 mi)	Mountain stage	9 June	Nairo Quintana (COL)
7	Morzine to Châtel	124.5 km (77.4 mi)	Mountain stage	10 June	Daniel Moreno (ESP)

== Stages ==
=== Prologue ===
3 June 2012 — Grenoble, 5.7 km (3.5 mi), individual time trial (ITT)

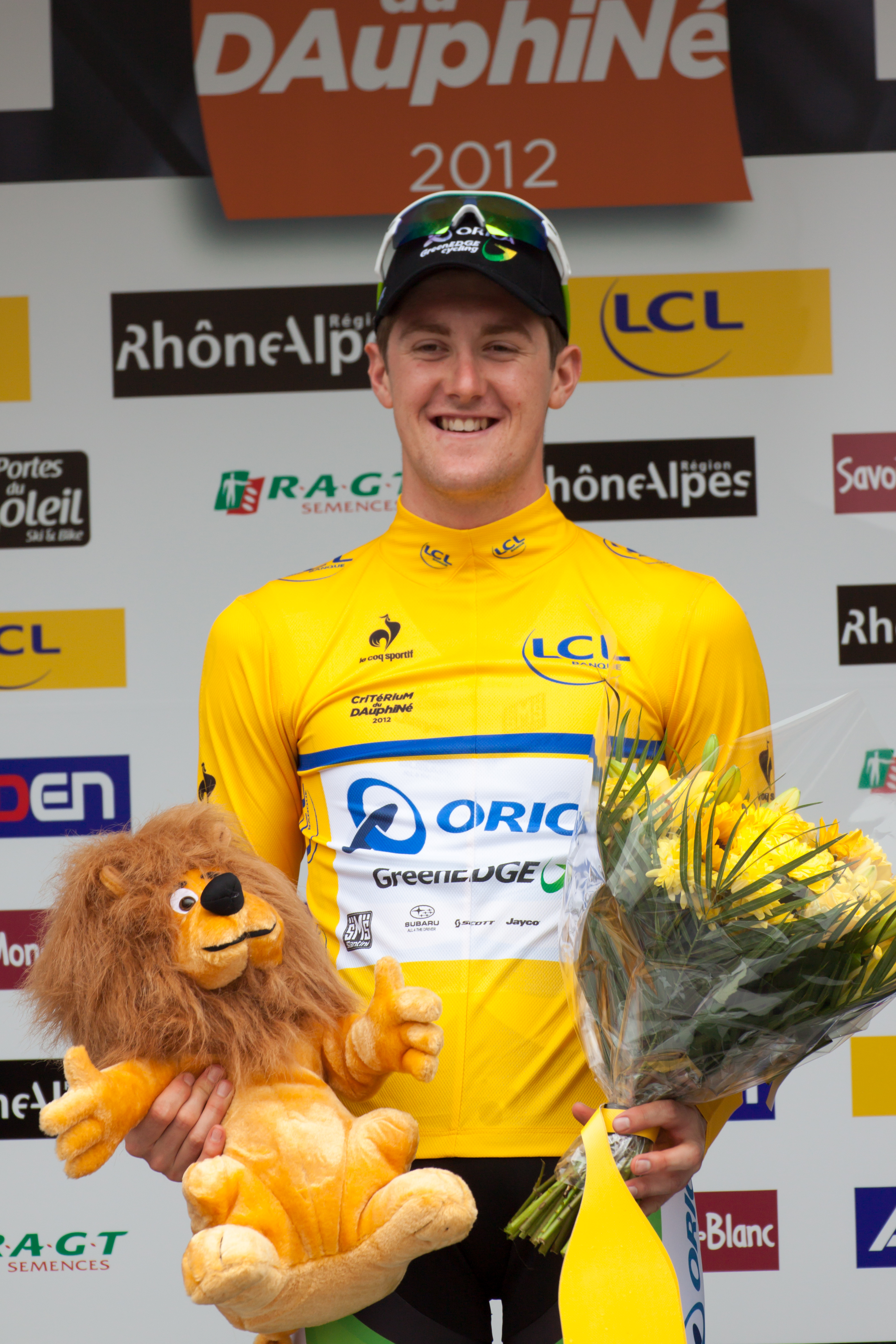
Orica–GreenEDGE's Luke Durbridge on the podium after winning the stage in Grenoble; it was his first win at World Tour level.

The Dauphiné began with its traditional short individual time trial stage, with a near-flat course around the streets of Grenoble; the city was hosting the prologue of the race for the fourth time in fifteen years following prior starts in 1997, 2000 and 2007, the last of which was won by the 2011 race winner Bradley Wiggins, then riding for the Cofidis team. With rain expected to disrupt the stage, as it had done so in the 2011 prologue, teams decided to spread their time trial specialists across the field in order to maximise their potential of winning the stage. For the first rider to depart the start in Grenoble, Vacansoleil–DCM's Lieuwe Westra, weather conditions were dry. Westra ultimately recorded a time of 6' 46" for the stage, which was good enough for a top-12 stage placing after all 175 riders had taken to the course. Westra's time was beaten shortly afterwards by Rabobank rider Carlos Barredo, who went four seconds quicker around the course, 5.7 km (3.5 mi) in length.

Barredo held the top spot for around quarter of an hour, as his time was marginally beaten by Andriy Hryvko, a four-time Ukrainian champion in the discipline, riding for the Astana team. Soon after, the eventual stage-winning performance was recorded by the Australian national champion Luke Durbridge, for Orica–GreenEDGE. Durbridge set a time of 6' 38", in the favourable conditions; he held on to his spot throughout the expected changeable weather that was a factor in the remainder of the running order. Following a rain shower that effected the racing during the middle portion of the stage, the later riders to take to the course did have dry roads to contend with but the wind had picked up and made conditions more difficult than what the earlier riders had for their passages through the parcours. Durbridge's time remained untroubled to the end, despite the best attempts of defending champion Wiggins, who finished just 1.35 seconds in arrears in second place, having started last of the 175 competitors. Thus, Durbridge took his first stage victory at World Tour level, which gave him a clean sweep of the jerseys post-stage, for holding the lead of the overall, points and young rider classifications. Other overall contenders Tejay van Garderen (BMC Racing Team), Omega Pharma–Quick-Step's Tony Martin, Jérôme Coppel (Saur–Sojasun), as well as van Garderen's team-mate Cadel Evans and 2010 winner Janez Brajkovič (Astana) all lost time in comparison to Wiggins; Martin placed best in fifth position, although Evans also made the top ten, in ninth place.

Prologue Result and General Classification after Prologue

	Rider	Team	Time
1	Luke Durbridge (AUS)	Orica–GreenEDGE	6' 38"
2	Bradley Wiggins (GBR)	Team Sky	+ 1"
3	Andriy Hryvko (UKR)	Astana	+ 3"
4	Carlos Barredo (ESP)	Rabobank	+ 3"
5	Tony Martin (GER)	Omega Pharma–Quick-Step	+ 5"
6	Simon Gerrans (AUS)	Orica–GreenEDGE	+ 5"
7	Paul Martens (GER)	Rabobank	+ 5"
8	Sylvain Chavanel (FRA)	Omega Pharma–Quick-Step	+ 6"
9	Cadel Evans (AUS)	BMC Racing Team	+ 6"
10	Andrey Amador (CRC)	Movistar Team	+ 7"

=== Stage 1 ===
4 June 2012 — Seyssins to Saint-Vallier, 187 km (116.2 mi)

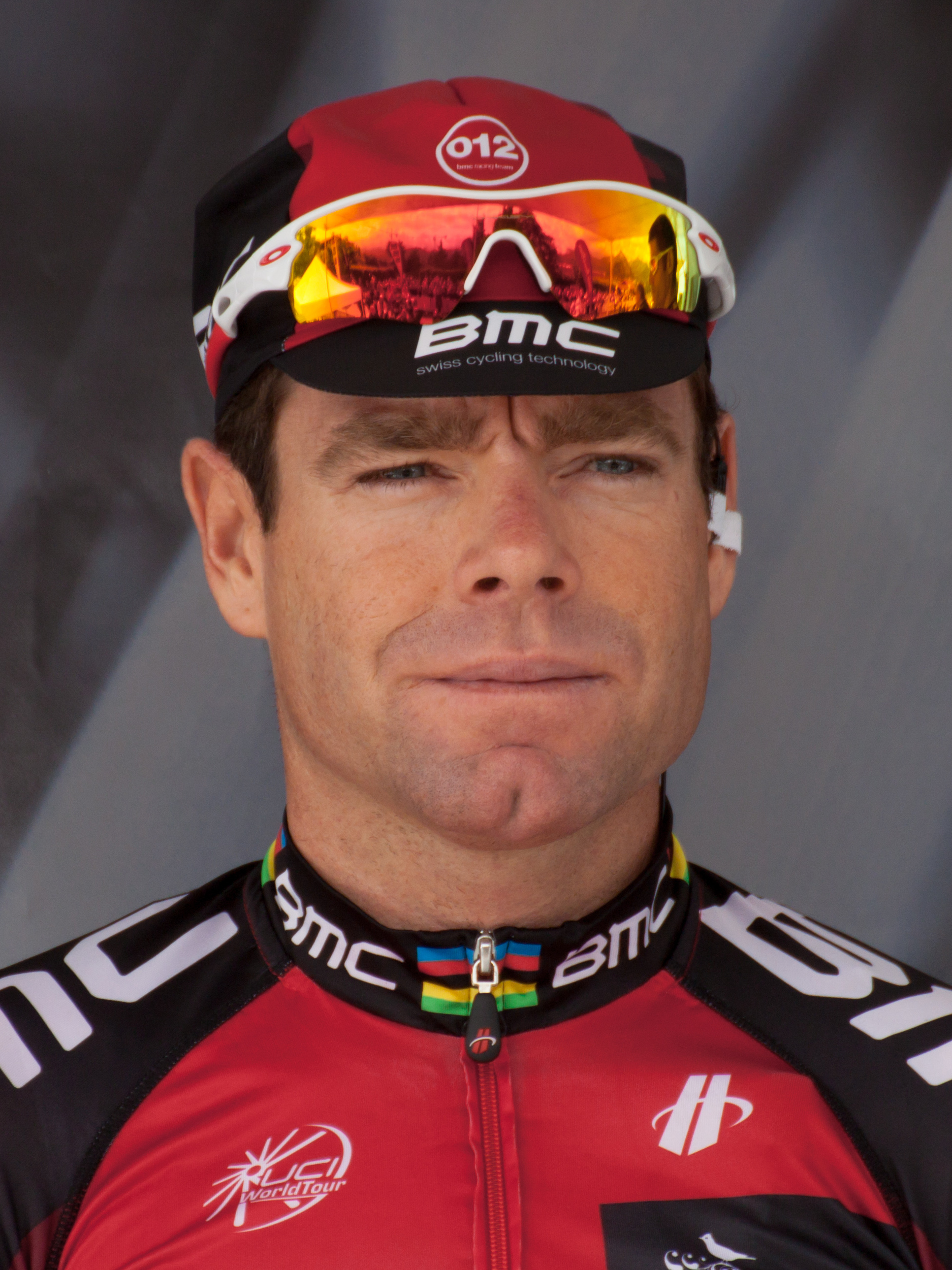
BMC Racing Team's Cadel Evans prior to the stage. His victory, coupled with a four-second time gap to the peloton, allowed him to move up to second place in the general classification. It also gave him the lead in the points classification standings, taking the green jersey from Orica–GreenEDGE rider Luke Durbridge.

With no fewer than six categorised climbs during the 187 km (116.2 mi) parcours, the first mass-start stage was not ideally suited towards the sprinters, but was favourable towards puncheurs, as the final of the six climbs – the third-category Côte de la Sizeranne – came just 9 km (5.6 mi) from the stage's finish in Saint-Vallier. Six riders – Giovanni Bernaudeau (Team Europcar), RadioShack–Nissan rider Markel Irizar, Rabobank's Maarten Tjallingii, Nicolas Edet of Cofidis, Sep Vanmarcke (Garmin–Barracuda) and Argos–Shimano rider Yukihiro Doi – advanced clear of the main field in the early running of the stage; the sextet managed to extend their advantage to a maximum of over thirteen minutes around a quarter of the way through the stage. Around the same point, a crash involving Pierrick Fédrigo (FDJ–BigMat) and Samuel Sánchez (Euskaltel–Euskadi) brought both riders down. Neither rider returned to the main group, as Fédrigo lost over six minutes and Sánchez almost four times that; losing almost 24 minutes, after reports that he had been suffering with broken ribs. He was taken to hospital after the stage, where he was diagnosed with bruised ribs.

The teams of several of the general classification contenders were prevalent on the front of the peloton as they set about reducing the advantage that the breakaway group of six riders were holding over them. The gap had been reduced to around the three-minute mark with 50 km (31.1 mi) left of the stage to cover. Another big crash happened some 20 km (12.4 mi) later with Orica–GreenEDGE's Simon Gerrans, Vacansoleil–DCM rider Pim Ligthart and Dan Martin of Garmin–Barracuda among those to hit the tarmac. Omega Pharma–Quick-Step moved forward, and pulled the gap under two minutes and caused the breakaway to splinter through pressure. Bernaudeau – who had figured at each of the mountain passes to the point – and Doi failed to stay with their companions as they approached the day's final climb, the Côte de la Sizeranne. Tjallingii was also dropped by the remaining members of the breakaway, while in the main field, Alexander Vinokourov (Astana) and Andy Schleck of RadioShack–Nissan – who had been criticised by team manager Johan Bruyneel for his poor opening half to the season – were both struggling off the back of the group. Both riders lost over three minutes by the stage end.

As the lead group approached the top of the Côte de la Sizeranne, Irizar attacked from the group of the remaining three breakaway riders, while Vanmarcke and Edet were joined by Team Europcar rider Pierre Rolland, who had escaped the confines of the main group itself. Another three-rider move went forwards from the peloton as Rolland's team-mate Cyril Gautier, Rabobank's Luis León Sánchez and BMC Racing Team rider Philippe Gilbert got clear by several seconds. Irizar held a slim advantage, but overshot a corner and was eventually caught with around 5 km (3.1 mi) to go. As Irizar was caught, Jérôme Coppel of Saur–Sojasun counter-attacked, and was eventually joined by Cadel Evans – a team-mate of Gilbert at BMC Racing Team – and Astana's Andrey Kashechkin, who finished third in the race in 2007. The trio managed to hold off the closing peloton into the finish, where Evans managed to fend off the advances of Coppel and Kashechkin to take the stage win. FDJ–BigMat rider Nacer Bouhanni led home the peloton just four seconds in arrears, and with race leader Luke Durbridge (Orica–GreenEDGE) not featuring in the split peloton, Bradley Wiggins assumed the race lead for Team Sky; Evans moved up to second, one second behind Wiggins.

Stage 1 result

	Rider	Team	Time
1	Cadel Evans (AUS)	BMC Racing Team	4h 36' 21"
2	Jérôme Coppel (FRA)	Saur–Sojasun	s.t.
3	Andrey Kashechkin (KAZ)	Astana	s.t.
4	Nacer Bouhanni (FRA)	FDJ–BigMat	+ 4"
5	Tony Gallopin (FRA)	RadioShack–Nissan	+ 4"
6	Borut Božič (SLO)	Astana	+ 4"
7	Gerald Ciolek (GER)	Omega Pharma–Quick-Step	+ 4"
8	Julien Simon (FRA)	Saur–Sojasun	+ 4"
9	Daniele Ratto (ITA)	Liquigas–Cannondale	+ 4"
10	Edvald Boasson Hagen (NOR)	Team Sky	+ 4"

General Classification after Stage 1

	Rider	Team	Time
1	Bradley Wiggins (GBR)	Team Sky	4h 43' 04"
2	Cadel Evans (AUS)	BMC Racing Team	+ 1"
3	Andriy Hryvko (UKR)	Astana	+ 2"
4	Carlos Barredo (ESP)	Rabobank	+ 2"
5	Tony Martin (GER)	Omega Pharma–Quick-Step	+ 4"
6	Paul Martens (GER)	Rabobank	+ 4"
7	Sylvain Chavanel (FRA)	Omega Pharma–Quick-Step	+ 5"
8	Jérôme Coppel (FRA)	Saur–Sojasun	+ 6"
9	Andrey Amador (CRC)	Movistar Team	+ 6"
10	Edvald Boasson Hagen (NOR)	Team Sky	+ 6"

=== Stage 2 ===
5 June 2012 — Lamastre to Saint-Félicien, 160 km (99.4 mi)

Just like the previous day's stage, the second stage of the race also comprised six categorised climbs, packed into the 160 km (99.4 mi) route through the Ardèche region, with the highest point coming at the summit of the second-category Col de Montivernoux. The finish in Saint-Félicien came at the end of a 2.5 km (1.6 mi) climb, which would more or less rule out the sprinters more obviously than the first stage parcours. FDJ–BigMat rider Rémi Pauriol and Saur–Sojasun's Maxime Méderel broke clear of the peloton in the opening stages, and they were subsequently joined by a group which contained a number of overall race contenders including maillot jaune et bleu wearer Bradley Wiggins (Team Sky), Vincenzo Nibali of Liquigas–Cannondale and Omega Pharma–Quick-Step rider Sylvain Chavanel. The group was eventually reabsorbed back into the main group after around 20 km (12.4 mi) of racing.

After a period of stability within the main group, a four-rider move consisting of three French riders – David Moncoutié representing Cofidis, Blel Kadri of Ag2r–La Mondiale and Team Europcar's Christophe Kern, who won a stage during the 2011 race – as well as Colombia's Cayetano Sarmiento, riding for the Liquigas–Cannondale team, advanced clear of the field and quickly established an advantage over them; of those, Kadri was best-placed at just eleven seconds behind Wiggins prior to the stage. Team Sky marshalled the front of the peloton as a result, not letting the gap over four minutes at any point. Behind, there were several moves in order for riders to bridge a gap between the main field and the leaders; at the Col de Lalouvesc with 40 km (24.9 mi) to go, the leaders only held a gap of around half a minute over their chasers. Five riders tried to do so, but only one was able to stay in between the breakaway and the peloton.

FDJ–BigMat's Anthony Roux was the rider in question, and he set off after the quartet up front, and was able to reach them with around 7 km (4.3 mi) remaining of the stage. However, the peloton was not far behind, and the breakaway did not last much longer after that. With the field back together, several riders attempted solo moves off the front of the peloton, including Kadri's team-mate Mikaël Cherel, but all were unsuccessful. The group remained together into the climb towards the finish; Liquigas–Cannondale and BMC Racing Team headed the group, protecting their main riders Nibali and Cadel Evans from any potential trouble. World time trial champion Tony Martin tried to get clear within the final kilometre for Omega Pharma–Quick-Step but could not sustain a gap over everyone else, and Team Katusha rider Daniel Moreno timed his sprint perfectly, to take his third win of the season, ahead of French pair Julien Simon (Saur–Sojasun) and RadioShack–Nissan's Tony Gallopin. Wiggins finished ninth to maintain his one-second overall lead over Evans, who was seventh.

Stage 2 result

	Rider	Team	Time
1	Daniel Moreno (ESP)	Team Katusha	4h 02' 38"
2	Julien Simon (FRA)	Saur–Sojasun	s.t.
3	Tony Gallopin (FRA)	RadioShack–Nissan	s.t.
4	Rinaldo Nocentini (ITA)	Ag2r–La Mondiale	s.t.
5	Jurgen Van den Broeck (BEL)	Lotto–Belisol	s.t.
6	Luis León Sánchez (ESP)	Rabobank	s.t.
7	Cadel Evans (AUS)	BMC Racing Team	s.t.
8	Janez Brajkovič (SLO)	Astana	s.t.
9	Bradley Wiggins (GBR)	Team Sky	s.t.
10	Thomas Voeckler (FRA)	Team Europcar	s.t.

General Classification after Stage 2

	Rider	Team	Time
1	Bradley Wiggins (GBR)	Team Sky	8h 45' 42"
2	Cadel Evans (AUS)	BMC Racing Team	+ 1"
3	Andriy Hryvko (UKR)	Astana	+ 2"
4	Carlos Barredo (ESP)	Rabobank	+ 2"
5	Tony Martin (GER)	Omega Pharma–Quick-Step	+ 4"
6	Paul Martens (GER)	Rabobank	+ 4"
7	Sylvain Chavanel (FRA)	Omega Pharma–Quick-Step	+ 5"
8	Jérôme Coppel (FRA)	Saur–Sojasun	+ 6"
9	Andrey Amador (CRC)	Movistar Team	+ 6"
10	Richie Porte (AUS)	Team Sky	+ 7"

=== Stage 3 ===
6 June 2012 — Givors to La Clayette, 167 km (103.8 mi)

With a lengthy individual time trial and three mountainous stages left during the itinerary, the third stage was billed as the sprinters' one remaining chance at a stage victory at the Dauphiné. As such, the parcours of the stage suited them; although there were three categorised climbs during the stage – a third-category climb and two fourth-category passes – they were all within the first half of the stage. Two riders – Spanish pairing Luis Ángel Maté of Cofidis and Euskaltel–Euskadi rider Egoi Martínez – went clear almost immediately after the start of the stage, making the early breakaway from the field, and the duo managed to extend their advantage over the main field to around five-and-a-half minutes, within the first 20 km (12.4 mi) of the stage. Behind the lead pair, Team Europcar's Giovanni Bernaudeau was the first rider from the peloton to cross the fourth-category climbs, and regained the lead of the mountains classification from Ag2r–La Mondiale rider Blel Kadri.

Argos–Shimano and FDJ–BigMat looked to set the tempo on the front of the peloton, in the hopes of getting their respective sprinters John Degenkolb and Nacer Bouhanni towards the front if a sprint finish materialised. It was those two teams who gradually brought back Maté and Martínez for the majority of the parcours, but as the race drew nearer La Clayette, more teams put men into the relay and the breakaway was ended inside the final 15 km (9.3 mi). Omega Pharma–Quick-Step held their riders on the front of the peloton in the closing stages, with Sylvain Chavanel, seventh overall, being protected by his team-mates before setting the pace at times. Degenkolb's chances for the stage ended with around 2 km (1.2 mi) remaining due to a puncture. Philippe Gilbert attacked for BMC Racing Team with 1.5 km (0.9 mi) to go, gaining an advantage of a few seconds but was caught with around 300 m (980 ft) left.

RadioShack–Nissan looked to get Tony Gallopin in position for the sprint, while behind, Ricardo Garcia (Euskaltel–Euskadi) clipped the barriers, and fell back into the path of the sprint causing the majority of the field to be hampered; all riders that were impacted by the crash were eventually given the same time. Up front, Edvald Boasson Hagen (Team Sky) launched his sprint off the wheel of Gerald Ciolek (Omega Pharma–Quick-Step), and won the stage by a bike length from Ciolek with Astana's Borut Božič completing the podium. Due to the crash in the closing metres and the resultant nullification of any time gaps, Boasson Hagen's team-mate Bradley Wiggins maintained his one-second lead in the general classification over Cadel Evans (BMC Racing Team), despite his earlier reservations of holding the lead into the time trial due to the skinsuit type provided by the race organisation compared to that of his team. Evans also lost the lead of the points classification to Gallopin, who achieved his third consecutive top-ten finish at the line; adding the points jersey to the young rider jersey that he had already achieved, after Boasson Hagen was dropped the previous day.

Stage 3 result

	Rider	Team	Time
1	Edvald Boasson Hagen (NOR)	Team Sky	4h 22' 13"
2	Gerald Ciolek (GER)	Omega Pharma–Quick-Step	s.t.
3	Borut Božič (SLO)	Astana	s.t.
4	Roger Kluge (GER)	Argos–Shimano	s.t.
5	Murilo Fischer (BRA)	Garmin–Barracuda	s.t.
6	Tony Gallopin (FRA)	RadioShack–Nissan	s.t.
7	Davide Cimolai (ITA)	Lampre–ISD	s.t.
8	Michael Matthews (AUS)	Rabobank	s.t.
9	Sébastien Hinault (FRA)	Ag2r–La Mondiale	s.t.
10	Jonathan Cantwell (AUS)	Team Saxo Bank	s.t.

General Classification after Stage 3

	Rider	Team	Time
1	Bradley Wiggins (GBR)	Team Sky	13h 07' 55"
2	Cadel Evans (AUS)	BMC Racing Team	+ 1"
3	Andriy Hryvko (UKR)	Astana	+ 2"
4	Carlos Barredo (ESP)	Rabobank	+ 2"
5	Tony Martin (GER)	Omega Pharma–Quick-Step	+ 4"
6	Paul Martens (GER)	Rabobank	+ 4"
7	Sylvain Chavanel (FRA)	Omega Pharma–Quick-Step	+ 5"
8	Jérôme Coppel (FRA)	Saur–Sojasun	+ 6"
9	Andrey Amador (CRC)	Movistar Team	+ 6"
10	Richie Porte (AUS)	Team Sky	+ 7"

=== Stage 4 ===
7 June 2012 — Villié-Morgon to Bourg-en-Bresse, 53.5 km (33.2 mi), individual time trial (ITT)

Unlike the third stage time trial in 2011, in which the course used in Grenoble largely set the route for the penultimate-day time trial in the Tour de France a month later, the time trial in the 2012 event was held on an independent course, running from west-to-east between Villié-Morgon and Bourg-en-Bresse, with an undulating parcours that only amounted to a 61 m (200 ft) difference in altitude from start to finish. As was customary of time trial stages, the riders set off in reverse order from where they were ranked in the general classification at the end of the previous stage. Thus, Arnaud Gérard of FDJ–BigMat, who, in 172nd place – of the 175 starters – trailed overall leader Bradley Wiggins (Team Sky) by thirty minutes and forty-nine seconds, was the first rider to set off on the stage. However, he was not the first to finish as he was passed by the two riders directly behind him on the start order, that started at one-minute intervals, Dan Martin of Garmin–Barracuda and Orica–GreenEDGE's Travis Meyer.

Meyer recorded a time of one hour, seven minutes and fifty seconds as he was first to reach the line; his time held for around a quarter of an hour, as no rider could get within twenty seconds of his time, until his team-mate Luke Durbridge, the prologue winner and incumbent under-23 world time trial champion crossed the finish line in a time of one hour, four minutes and forty-nine seconds, just over three minutes quicker than Meyer. Durbridge's time held top spot for over two hours, as the majority of the field failed to match his time for the 53.5 km (33.2 mi) course. It was not until Wilco Kelderman of the Rabobank team – starting 143rd as opposed to Durbridge starting 19th – had set quicker times at each of the intermediate timing points that Durbridge's time came under threat from another rider, and Kelderman ultimately beat Durbridge's time by twelve seconds, despite almost overshooting the final corner, narrowly avoiding the barriers on the outside of the corner. At the end of the stage, Kelderman stated that his performance came as "a surprise", taking the lead of the young rider classification from Tony Gallopin (RadioShack–Nissan) in the process.

The first of four Team Sky riders to start within the final twenty-five riders, Chris Froome got within eight seconds of Kelderman's time, but it was not until another of the team's riders, Michael Rogers, that the lead changed hands. Although he trailed at the first intermediate point, Rogers overhauled the time of Kelderman at the finish by fourteen seconds; he held the lead into the final five starters, where it was then taken by the world time trial champion Tony Martin, riding for the Omega Pharma–Quick-Step team. Martin bettered the time of Rogers by 37 seconds, but it was not to last as Wiggins was cementing his overall lead. Wiggins made up a deficit of seven seconds to Martin at the first intermediate point, and turned it into a 36-second lead in the space of 22 km (13.7 mi), eventually taking the stage victory by 34 seconds over Martin. Such was Wiggins' performance, which he later deemed "satisfying", that he was almost catching Cadel Evans (BMC Racing Team) on the road, despite Evans starting two minutes before Wiggins; Evans ultimately finished the stage in eighth position, 1' 43" down on Wiggins' time. RadioShack–Nissan rider Andy Schleck, another of the overall contenders for the Tour de France along with Evans and Wiggins, lost over ten minutes to Wiggins on the stage after a crash and a puncture.

Stage 4 result

	Rider	Team	Time
1	Bradley Wiggins (GBR)	Team Sky	1h 03' 12"
2	Tony Martin (GER)	Omega Pharma–Quick-Step	+ 34"
3	Michael Rogers (AUS)	Team Sky	+ 1' 11"
4	Wilco Kelderman (NED)	Rabobank	+ 1' 25"
5	Sylvain Chavanel (FRA)	Omega Pharma–Quick-Step	+ 1' 33"
6	Chris Froome (GBR)	Team Sky	+ 1' 33"
7	Luke Durbridge (AUS)	Orica–GreenEDGE	+ 1' 37"
8	Cadel Evans (AUS)	BMC Racing Team	+ 1' 43"
9	David Millar (GBR)	Garmin–Barracuda	+ 1' 51"
10	Luis León Sánchez (ESP)	Rabobank	+ 1' 53"

General Classification after Stage 4

	Rider	Team	Time
1	Bradley Wiggins (GBR)	Team Sky	14h 11' 07"
2	Tony Martin (GER)	Omega Pharma–Quick-Step	+ 38"
3	Michael Rogers (AUS)	Team Sky	+ 1' 20"
4	Sylvain Chavanel (FRA)	Omega Pharma–Quick-Step	+ 1' 38"
5	Cadel Evans (AUS)	BMC Racing Team	+ 1' 44"
6	Wilco Kelderman (NED)	Rabobank	+ 1' 45"
7	Chris Froome (GBR)	Team Sky	+ 1' 48"
8	David Millar (GBR)	Garmin–Barracuda	+ 2' 00"
9	Luis León Sánchez (ESP)	Rabobank	+ 2' 02"
10	Andriy Hryvko (UKR)	Astana	+ 2' 18"

=== Stage 5 ===
8 June 2012 — Saint-Trivier-sur-Moignans to Rumilly, 186.5 km (115.9 mi)

The first of three mountainous stages to conclude the Dauphiné, the fifth stage of the race was seen as a precursor to the tenth stage of July's Tour de France, with the majority of the day's route making up the parcours of that stage to be held on 11 July. Three categorised climbs were part of the 186.5 km (115.9 mi) parcours of the day, notably the hors catégorie Le Grand Colombier – making its début in the race – with an average gradient of 6.9%, reaching up to an altitude of 1,501 m (4,925 ft), but the summit of the final climb – the Col de Richemond – came with 45.5 km (28.3 mi) remaining of the stage. Mini-attacks set the course of the early running of the stage, which was carried out a quick pace, with the peloton covering 48.3 km (30.0 mi) in the first hour of racing. After Ag2r–La Mondiale rider Blel Kadri escaped out of the peloton to take the honours at the first summit of the day, the Côte de Corlier, it was not until the uncategorised Col de la Berche several kilometres later that a group of riders managed to get clear.

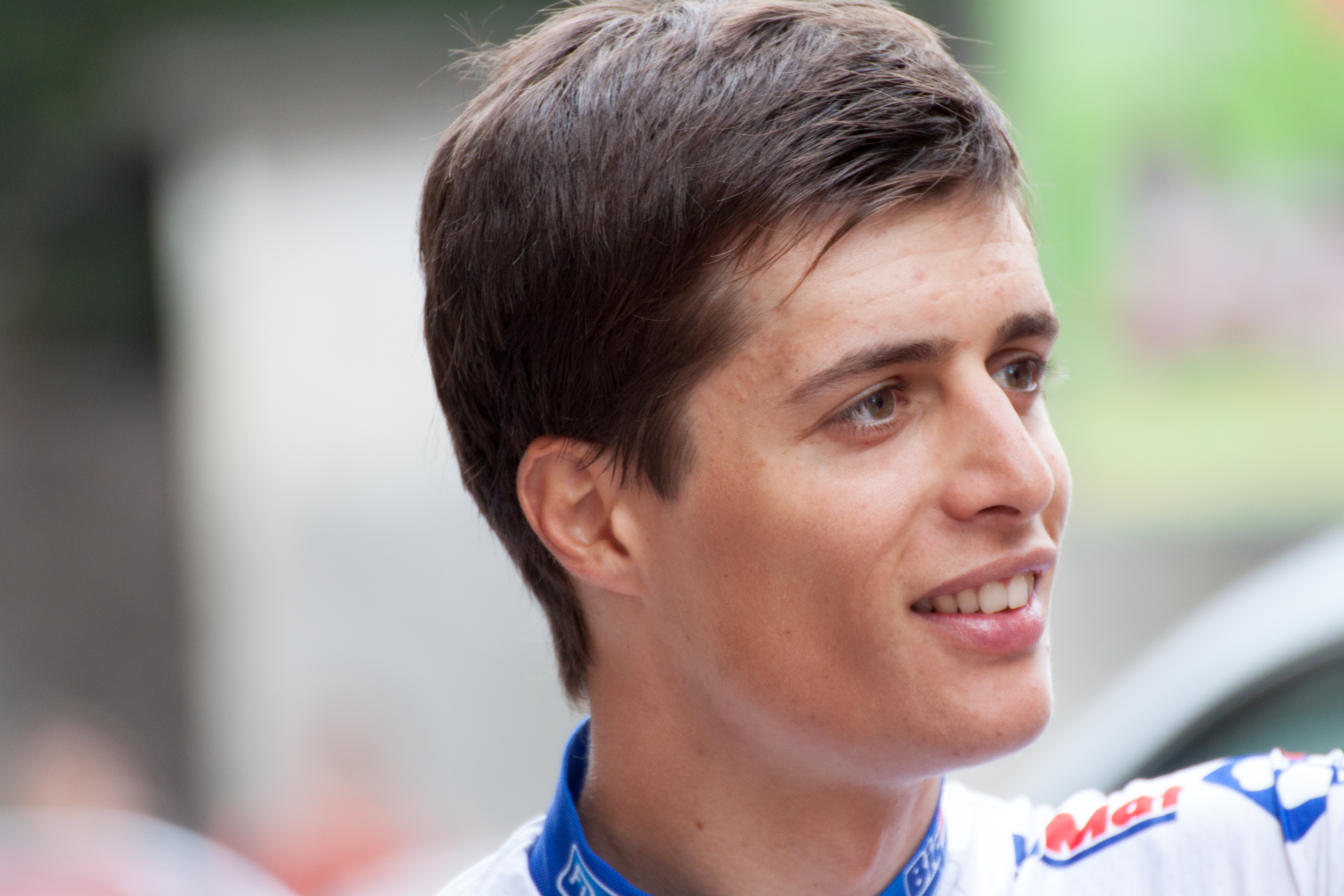
FDJ–BigMat rider Arthur Vichot, pictured before the prologue of the race, soloed away from his breakaway companions with 7 kilometres (4.3 miles) remaining of the stage and pulled clear to an eventual stage-winning margin of 26 seconds.

A total of ten riders went clear, and quickly gathered a five-minute lead over the rest of the field. At the foot of Le Grand Colombier, another seven riders formed a chase group on the road ahead of the peloton, which was later reduced to just Christophe Kern (Team Europcar) and Brice Feillu (Saur–Sojasun), after Kern had upped the pace in the group. At this point, Kern's team-mate Kévin Reza was dropped from the lead group, and the peloton itself had been slimmed to around fifty riders, with Sylvain Chavanel (Omega Pharma–Quick-Step) and David Millar (Garmin–Barracuda) – both in the top ten of the general classification overnight – along with Astana's Alexander Vinokourov among those that did not feature within the peloton. On the descent from the climb, a group of BMC Racing Team riders including Cadel Evans, George Hincapie and Tejay van Garderen broke out from the peloton, in the hope of pulling Evans nearer the overall lead of Team Sky's Bradley Wiggins, following his time loss the previous day in the individual time trial.

Having caught Kern and Feillu on the road, the group lost ground to the peloton and with Wiggins later joining up with the group, Evans' efforts were in vain; with the group now back together as a whole, their efforts went back to the original break. Kern was part of another six-rider wave that went clear on the descent from the Col de Richemond, with the highest-placed rider being ninth-placed Luis León Sánchez of Rabobank. Team Sky took up station on the front of the main field, not allowing Sánchez to gain too much ground. The gap peaked out at around the 30-second mark and with nobody looking to help Sánchez with the pace-making in the group, they sat up and allowed to be reabsorbed into the peloton. FDJ–BigMat's Arthur Vichot attacked out of the lead group with around 7 km (4.3 mi) to go, and soloed away from his breakaway companions to take the victory by 26 seconds from the rest of the group. The peloton crossed the line around one minute down on Vichot, with Wiggins maintaining his 38-second overall lead as he was part of that group.

Stage 5 result

	Rider	Team	Time
1	Arthur Vichot (FRA)	FDJ–BigMat	4h 42' 17"
2	Egoi Martínez (ESP)	Euskaltel–Euskadi	+ 26"
3	Dmitry Fofonov (KAZ)	Astana	+ 26"
4	Rémy Di Gregorio (FRA)	Cofidis	+ 26"
5	Cayetano Sarmiento (COL)	Liquigas–Cannondale	+ 26"
6	Alberto Losada (ESP)	Team Katusha	+ 26"
7	Daniel Navarro (ESP)	Team Saxo Bank	+ 26"
8	Maxime Méderel (FRA)	Saur–Sojasun	+ 26"
9	Maxime Bouet (FRA)	Ag2r–La Mondiale	+ 46"
10	Bruno Pires (POR)	Team Saxo Bank	+ 46"

General Classification after Stage 5

	Rider	Team	Time
1	Bradley Wiggins (GBR)	Team Sky	18h 54' 23"
2	Tony Martin (GER)	Omega Pharma–Quick-Step	+ 38"
3	Michael Rogers (AUS)	Team Sky	+ 1' 20"
4	Cadel Evans (AUS)	BMC Racing Team	+ 1' 44"
5	Wilco Kelderman (NED)	Rabobank	+ 1' 45"
6	Chris Froome (GBR)	Team Sky	+ 1' 48"
7	Luis León Sánchez (ESP)	Rabobank	+ 2' 02"
8	Jurgen Van den Broeck (BEL)	Lotto–Belisol	+ 2' 22"
9	Janez Brajkovič (SLO)	Astana	+ 2' 47"
10	Jérôme Coppel (FRA)	Saur–Sojasun	+ 2' 55"

=== Stage 6 ===
9 June 2012 — Saint-Alban-Leysse to Morzine, 167.5 km (104.1 mi)

The queen stage of the 2012 Dauphiné, the penultimate stage consisted of six categorised climbs during its 167.5 km (104.1 mi) parcours, the first of which coming after only 11 km (6.8 mi) with the first-category Col de Plainpalais. After a pair of third-category passes, the field tackled another first-category climb, the Col de la Colombière coming with 65 km (40.4 mi) remaining of the stage. Inside the final 40 km (24.9 mi), the day's two remaining climbs were ascented; the third-category Côte de Châtillon, and the race's second and final hors catégorie climb, with the Col de Joux Plane – reaching an altitude of 1,691 m (5,548 ft) – being the start of the run-in towards Morzine, with the summit of the climb coming with 12 km (7.5 mi) to go of the stage.

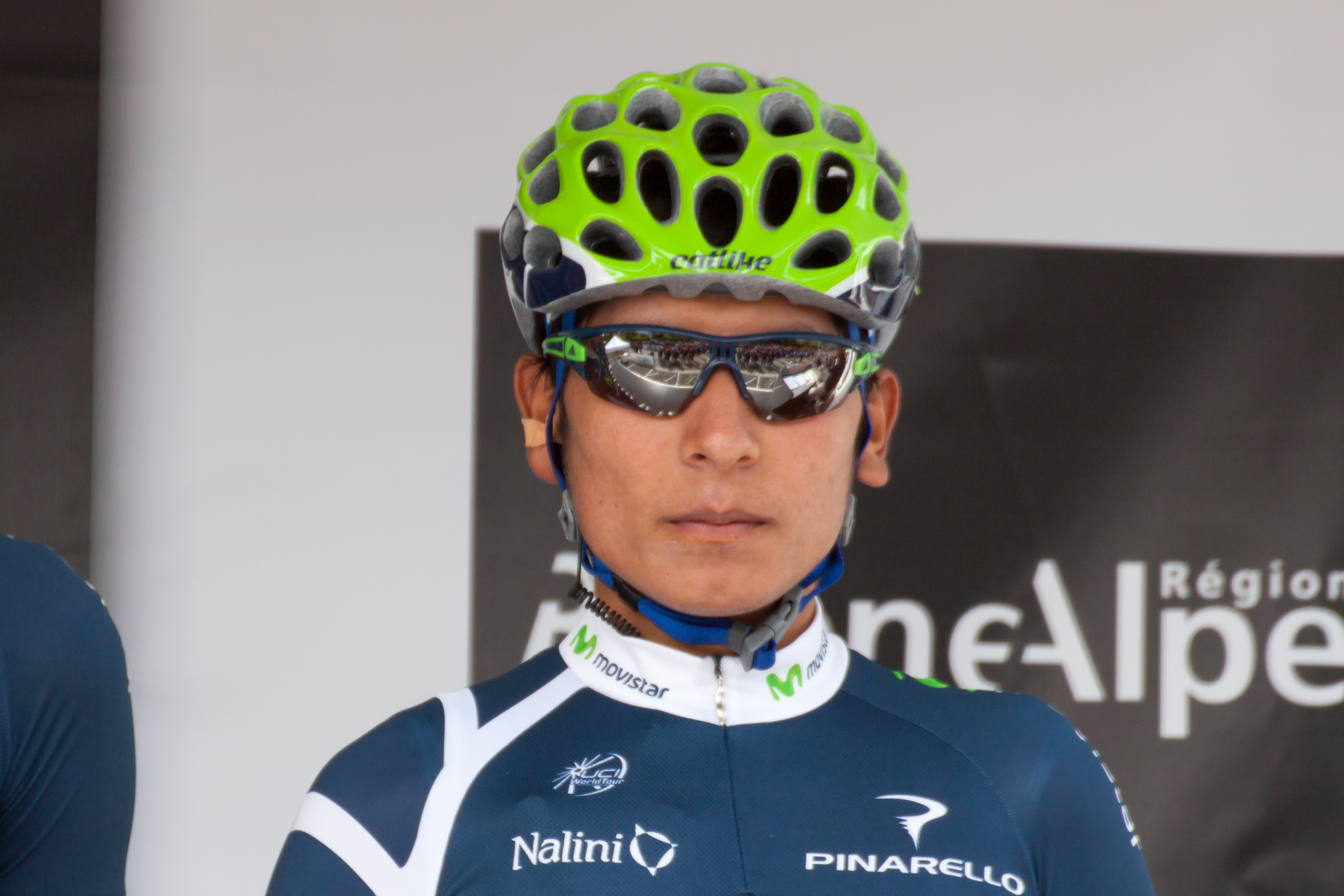
Nairo Quintana of the Movistar Team, pictured before the first stage, achieved his first victory at World Tour level after attacking on the hors catégorie Col de Joux Plane climb. He pulled clear of the race favourites in the closing 10 kilometres (6.2 miles) of the stage, and won the stage by 16 seconds.

Nineteen riders went clear of the peloton almost immediately after the start of the stage; among those riders were the two combatants for the mountains classification, Blel Kadri of Ag2r–La Mondiale and Liquigas–Cannondale's Cayetano Sarmiento. Sarmiento took out maximum points at each of the first two climbs, and thus extended his points advantage that he held over Kadri. With RadioShack–Nissan's Tiago Machado being the best-placed rider of the group at almost six minutes down on overall leader Bradley Wiggins (Team Sky), Wiggins' team-mates were leading the peloton around four minutes down on the lead group. Astana rider Andriy Hryvko, who had been in the top three earlier in the race, then joined the group after attacking out the front of the peloton. Saur–Sojasun's Brice Feillu accelerated out of the lead group on the Côte de Châtillon, and soon picked up a gap of over a minute ahead of his former breakaway companions, while the peloton had fallen a little further away from Feillu, as they were almost four-and-a-half minutes behind on the climb.

FDJ–BigMat rider Anthony Roux attacked out of the peloton, holding station off the front for a period of time but was soon brought back by the peloton, still led by Team Sky with assistance from Jurgen Van den Broeck's Lotto–Belisol outfit. The group was brought back on the Col de Joux Plane, with only Feillu remaining off the front, almost 90 seconds clear. Nairo Quintana of the Movistar Team then attacked out of a diminishing favourites group, later followed by BMC Racing Team's Cadel Evans. Quintana was too far ahead for Evans to catch him back, and eventually achieved his first World Tour victory by sixteen seconds ahead of Evans, with Team Katusha's Daniel Moreno leading a group of eight riders, including Wiggins – and team-mates Michael Rogers and Chris Froome – as well as Van Den Broeck, across the line eight seconds later. With Omega Pharma–Quick-Step's Tony Martin being dropped on the stage, Wiggins opened up his lead to 1' 20" over Rogers, with Evans moving into third – taking the points classification lead in the process – ahead of Froome. RadioShack–Nissan's Andy Schleck, one of the favourites for July's Tour de France, abandoned during the stage citing a knee injury from his time trial crash.

Stage 6 result

	Rider	Team	Time
1	Nairo Quintana (COL)	Movistar Team	4h 46' 12"
2	Cadel Evans (AUS)	BMC Racing Team	+ 16"
3	Daniel Moreno (ESP)	Team Katusha	+ 24"
4	Bradley Wiggins (GBR)	Team Sky	+ 24"
5	Pieter Weening (NED)	Orica–GreenEDGE	+ 24"
6	Chris Froome (GBR)	Team Sky	+ 24"
7	Vasil Kiryienka (BLR)	Movistar Team	+ 24"
8	Jurgen Van den Broeck (BEL)	Lotto–Belisol	+ 24"
9	Michael Rogers (AUS)	Team Sky	+ 24"
10	Haimar Zubeldia (ESP)	RadioShack–Nissan	+ 24"

General Classification after Stage 6

	Rider	Team	Time
1	Bradley Wiggins (GBR)	Team Sky	23h 40' 59"
2	Michael Rogers (AUS)	Team Sky	+ 1' 20"
3	Cadel Evans (AUS)	BMC Racing Team	+ 1' 36"
4	Chris Froome (GBR)	Team Sky	+ 1' 48"
5	Jurgen Van den Broeck (BEL)	Lotto–Belisol	+ 2' 22"
6	Vasil Kiryienka (BLR)	Movistar Team	+ 2' 58"
7	Janez Brajkovič (SLO)	Astana	+ 3' 07"
8	Wilco Kelderman (NED)	Rabobank	+ 3' 26"
9	Richie Porte (AUS)	Team Sky	+ 3' 44"
10	Tejay van Garderen (USA)	BMC Racing Team	+ 3' 51"

=== Stage 7 ===
10 June 2012 — Morzine to Châtel, 124.5 km (77.4 mi)

Although the stage was relatively short at 124.5 km (77.4 mi) in length, the parcours still featured five categorised climbs – of which one was to the finish in Châtel – reaching its highest point with the first-category Col du Corbier. Mini-attacks set the course of the early running of the stage, with the field remaining as a whole for the first hour of racing after the attacks were closed down within minutes. It was not until a third of the way through the stage – some 40 km (24.9 mi) in – that a move was allowed to be established on the road, as Team Europcar rider Pierre Rolland, Saur–Sojasun's Jérôme Coppel and Lieuwe Westra of Vacansoleil–DCM accelerated out of the peloton. They were later joined by five more riders as Omega Pharma–Quick-Step pairing Sylvain Chavanel and Stijn Vandenbergh, Astana's Dmitry Fofonov, Yaroslav Popovych of RadioShack–Nissan and Christophe Le Mével representing the Garmin–Barracuda team provided some assistance to the breakaway move.

Coppel was the best-placed rider of the octet, as he was in fifteenth place overall overnight around four-and-a-half minutes down on race leader Bradley Wiggins (Team Sky); as such, the breakaway's advantage was not allowed to gather momentum and the gap remained between two and two-and-a-half minutes for the majority of the stage. Team Sky allowed BMC Racing Team to carry out most of the work in the peloton, with Wiggins keeping an eye on their rider Cadel Evans, who had made a late-race attack the previous day and gained time back to Wiggins. Coppel, Westra and Rolland, the break initiators, then went clear again on the second-category Côte de la Vernaz, but the peloton were still closing in on them, after chasing down a group that had got clear on the climb. Vincenzo Nibali (Liquigas–Cannondale) remained off the front, and tried to close down the leaders. Rolland and Coppel dropped Westra on the descent from the following Col du Corbier climb, where he was eventually joined by Nibali, but the solo move that he had put in was starting to show as he could not stay with Westra, and was eventually caught by the BMC Racing Team-led peloton with around 10 km (6.2 mi) remaining.

Westra was caught not long after that as the lead duo's advantage was diminishing by the kilometre, as they held a half-minute lead into the final 8 km (5.0 mi). Argos–Shimano's Alexandre Geniez attacked out of the main group, and caught his two countrymen up the road but the breakaway was not to succeed as they were caught with 2.3 km (1.4 mi) to go. Team Katusha took the front in the hope of a second stage win for Daniel Moreno, but Fabrice Jeandesboz attacked in the final kilometre for Saur–Sojasun but was closed down by Richie Porte, protecting his team leader Wiggins. Moreno and Rabobank's Luis León Sánchez battled it out for the stage honours, with Moreno edging out his compatriot for the victory. Wiggins crossed the line ten seconds behind the nine-man lead group, but it was enough for a second consecutive Dauphiné title by 1' 17" over team-mate Michael Rogers. Evans later stated that he was beaten by "the better rider", but remained pleased with his performance of third place, a stage victory and the points classification title.

Stage 7 result

	Rider	Team	Time
1	Daniel Moreno (ESP)	Team Katusha	2h 59' 37"
2	Luis León Sánchez (ESP)	Rabobank	s.t.
3	Cadel Evans (AUS)	BMC Racing Team	s.t.
4	Edvald Boasson Hagen (NOR)	Team Sky	s.t.
5	Rinaldo Nocentini (ITA)	Ag2r–La Mondiale	s.t.
6	Pieter Weening (NED)	Orica–GreenEDGE	s.t.
7	Jurgen Van den Broeck (BEL)	Lotto–Belisol	s.t.
8	Dries Devenyns (BEL)	Omega Pharma–Quick-Step	s.t.
9	Richie Porte (AUS)	Team Sky	s.t.
10	Michael Rogers (AUS)	Team Sky	+ 7"

Final General Classification

	Rider	Team	Time
1	Bradley Wiggins (GBR)	Team Sky	26h 40' 46"
2	Michael Rogers (AUS)	Team Sky	+ 1' 17"
3	Cadel Evans (AUS)	BMC Racing Team	+ 1' 26"
4	Chris Froome (GBR)	Team Sky	+ 1' 45"
5	Jurgen Van den Broeck (BEL)	Lotto–Belisol	+ 2' 12"
6	Vasil Kiryienka (BLR)	Movistar Team	+ 2' 58"
7	Janez Brajkovič (SLO)	Astana	+ 3' 07"
8	Wilco Kelderman (NED)	Rabobank	+ 3' 26"
9	Richie Porte (AUS)	Team Sky	+ 3' 34"
10	Haimar Zubeldia (ESP)	RadioShack–Nissan	+ 3' 50"

== Classification leadership ==
In the 2012 Critérium du Dauphiné, four different jerseys were awarded. For the general classification, calculated by adding each cyclist's finishing times on each stage, the leader received a yellow jersey with a blue bar. This classification was considered the most important of the 2012 Critérium du Dauphiné, and the winner of the classification was considered the winner of the race.

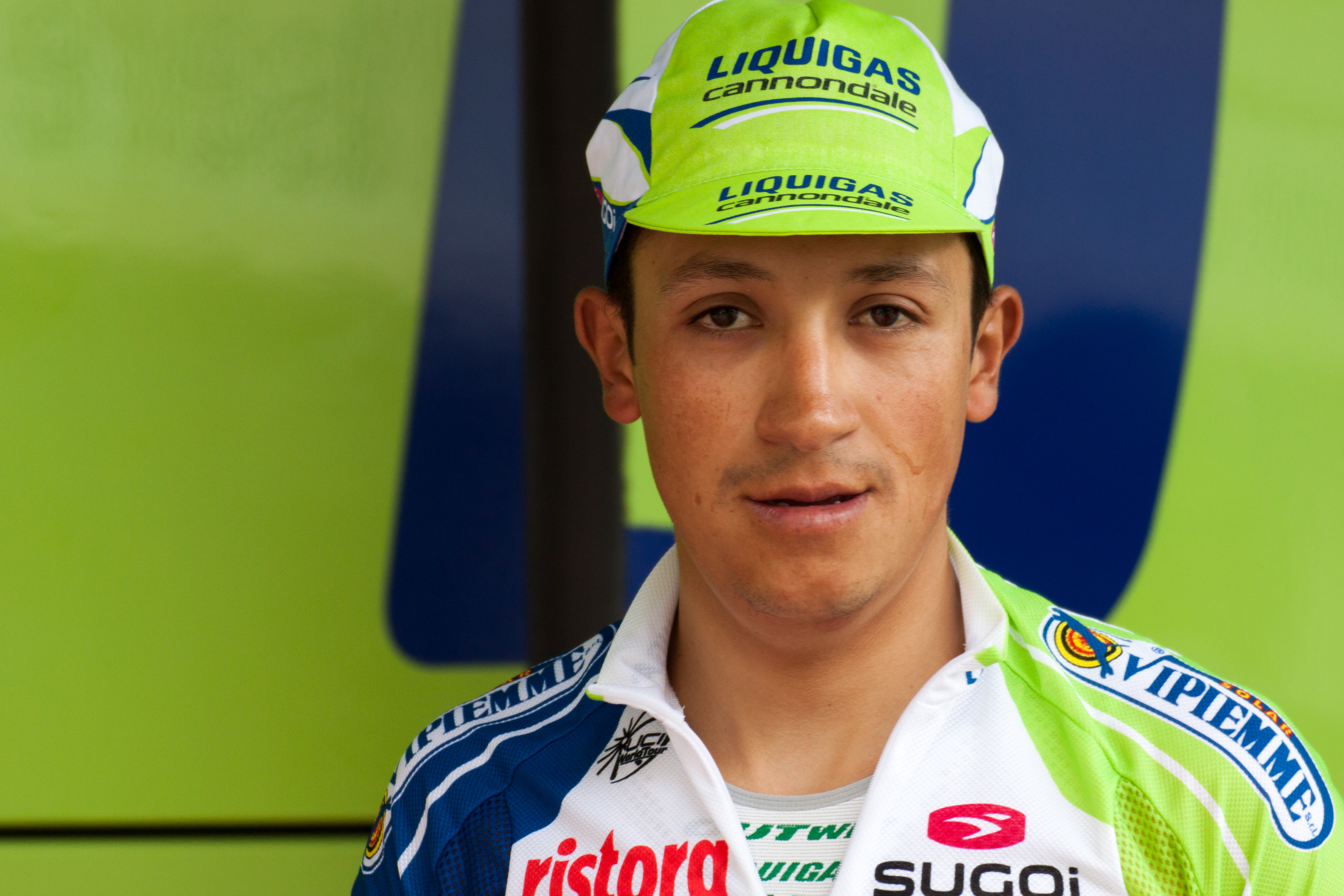
Cayetano Sarmiento, of the Liquigas–Cannondale team, was the winner of the mountains classification.

Additionally, there was a points classification, which awarded a green jersey. In the points classification, cyclists got points for finishing highly in a stage. For the first three mass-start stages – stages 1, 2 and 3 – the win earned 25 points, second place earned 22 points, third 20, fourth 18, fifth 16, and one point fewer per place down to a single point for 20th. For the prologue, individual time trial and final three stages, the win earned 15 points, second place earned 12 points, third 10, fourth 8, fifth 6, and one point fewer per place down to a single point for 10th.

There was also a mountains classification, the leadership of which was marked by a red and white polka-dot jersey. In the mountains classification, points were won by reaching the top of a climb before other cyclists. Each climb was categorised as either hors, first, second, third, or fourth-category, with more points available for the higher-categorised climbs. Hors catégorie climbs awarded the most points, with 20 points on offer for the first rider across the summit; the first ten riders were able to accrue points towards the mountains classification, compared with the first eight on first-category passes and the first six riders on second-category climbs. Fewer points were on offer for the smaller hills, marked as third-category or fourth-category.

The fourth jersey represented the young rider classification, marked by a white jersey. This was decided the same way as the general classification, but only riders born after 1 January 1987 were eligible to be ranked in the classification. There was also a classification for teams, in which the times of the best three cyclists per team on each stage were added together; the leading team at the end of the race was the team with the lowest total time.

Stage	Winner	General classification	Mountains classification	Points classification	Young rider classification	Team Classification
P	Luke Durbridge	Luke Durbridge	not awarded	Luke Durbridge	Luke Durbridge	Orica–GreenEDGE
1	Cadel Evans	Bradley Wiggins	Giovanni Bernaudeau	Cadel Evans	Edvald Boasson Hagen	Team Sky
2	Daniel Moreno	Bradley Wiggins	Blel Kadri	Cadel Evans	Tony Gallopin	Team Sky
3	Edvald Boasson Hagen	Bradley Wiggins	Giovanni Bernaudeau	Tony Gallopin	Tony Gallopin	Team Sky
4	Bradley Wiggins	Bradley Wiggins	Giovanni Bernaudeau	Tony Gallopin	Wilco Kelderman	Team Sky
5	Arthur Vichot	Bradley Wiggins	Cayetano Sarmiento	Tony Gallopin	Wilco Kelderman	Team Sky
6	Nairo Quintana	Bradley Wiggins	Cayetano Sarmiento	Cadel Evans	Wilco Kelderman	Team Sky
7	Daniel Moreno	Bradley Wiggins	Cayetano Sarmiento	Cadel Evans	Wilco Kelderman	Team Sky
Final		Bradley Wiggins	Cayetano Sarmiento	Cadel Evans	Wilco Kelderman	Team Sky
