= Cayetano Sarmiento =

Colombian road racing cyclist

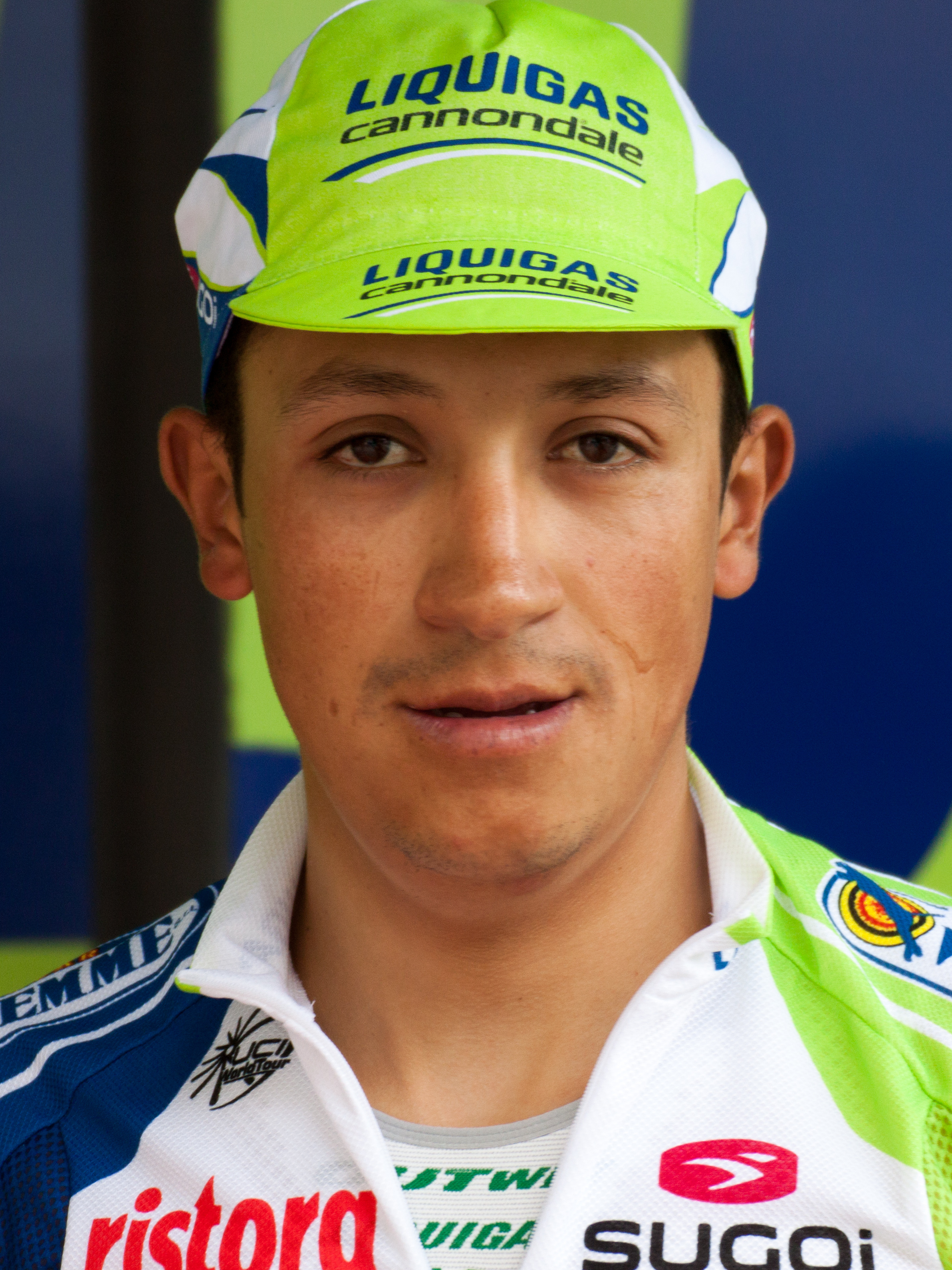
- Sarmiento at the 2012 Critérium du Dauphiné

Personal information
- Full name: Cayetano José Sarmiento Tunarrosa
- Born: 28 March 1987 (age 39) Arcabuco, Boyacá, Colombia
- Height: 1.68 m (5 ft 6 in)
- Weight: 56 kg (123 lb)

Cycling career
- Sport: Cycling
- Current team: Ingeniería de Vías
- Discipline: Road
- Role: Rider
- Rider type: Climber

Amateur teams
- 2007: Boyacá es Para Vivirla
- 2007–2008: Wackenhut
- 2008–2009: UNE
- 2017–2018: Boyacá es Para Vivirla
- 2020–: Ingeniería de Vías

Professional teams
- 2010–2011: Acqua & Sapone
- 2012–2014: Liquigas–Cannondale
- 2015: Colombia
- 2016: EPM–UNE–Área Metropolitana
- 2019: EPM
Medal record
Men's road bicycle racing
Representing Colombia
Pan American Championships
| Bronze medal – third place | 2009 Hidalgo | Road race |

Cayetano José Sarmiento Tunarrosa (born 28 March 1987) is a Colombian professional road bicycle racer, who currently rides for amateur team Ingeniería de Vías. Born in Arcabuco, Boyacá, Sarmiento has competed as a professional since 2010, competing for the Acqua & Sapone team prior to moving to Liquigas–Cannondale for the 2012 season.

== Major results ==
2007
3rd Overall Vuelta al Ecuador

1st Stage 1

2008
1st Overall Clásica Marinilla

1st Stage 2

1st Overall Clásica Nacional Ciudad de Anapoima

1st Stage 1

2nd Overall Clásica Internacional de Bogotá
3rd Overall Clásica Club Deportivo Boyacá
3rd Overall Vuelta a Colombia (under-23)

1st Stage 6

7th Overall Vuelta al Ecuador
2009
1st Overall Girobio
Pan American Road Championships

2nd Under-23 road race
3rd Road race

2nd Road race, National Under-23 Road Championships
2nd Overall Clasica Alcaldía de Pasca
2nd Overall Clásica Rionegro con Futuro-Aguas de Rionegro
4th Overall Giro della Valle d'Aosta Mont Blanc
5th Overall Clásica Ciudad de Girardot
5th Overall Clásica Nacional Ciudad de Anapoima
2010
5th Overall Tour of Slovenia
2012
1st Mountains classification Critérium du Dauphiné
2013
9th Overall Vuelta a Burgos

=== Grand Tour general classification results timeline ===
| Grand Tour | 2010 | 2011 | 2012 | 2013 |
|---|---|---|---|---|
| Giro d'Italia | 47 | 32 | — | 91 |
| Tour de France | — | — | — | — |
| Vuelta a España | — | — | 60 | 57 |

Legend
| — | Did not compete |
| DNF | Did not finish |

=== Other major stage races ===
| Race | 2012 | 2013 | 2014 | 2015 |
|---|---|---|---|---|
| Paris–Nice | — | — | — | — |
| Tirreno–Adriatico | — | — | — | — |
| Volta a Catalunya | — | — | 55 | 119 |
| Tour of the Basque Country | 41 | 24 | DNF | — |
| Tour de Romandie | 63 | — | 105 | — |
| Critérium du Dauphiné | 61 | 61 | DNF | — |
| Tour de Suisse | — | — | — | — |
