= Arcabuco =

Coordinates: 5°45′N 73°26′W

- Municipality and town
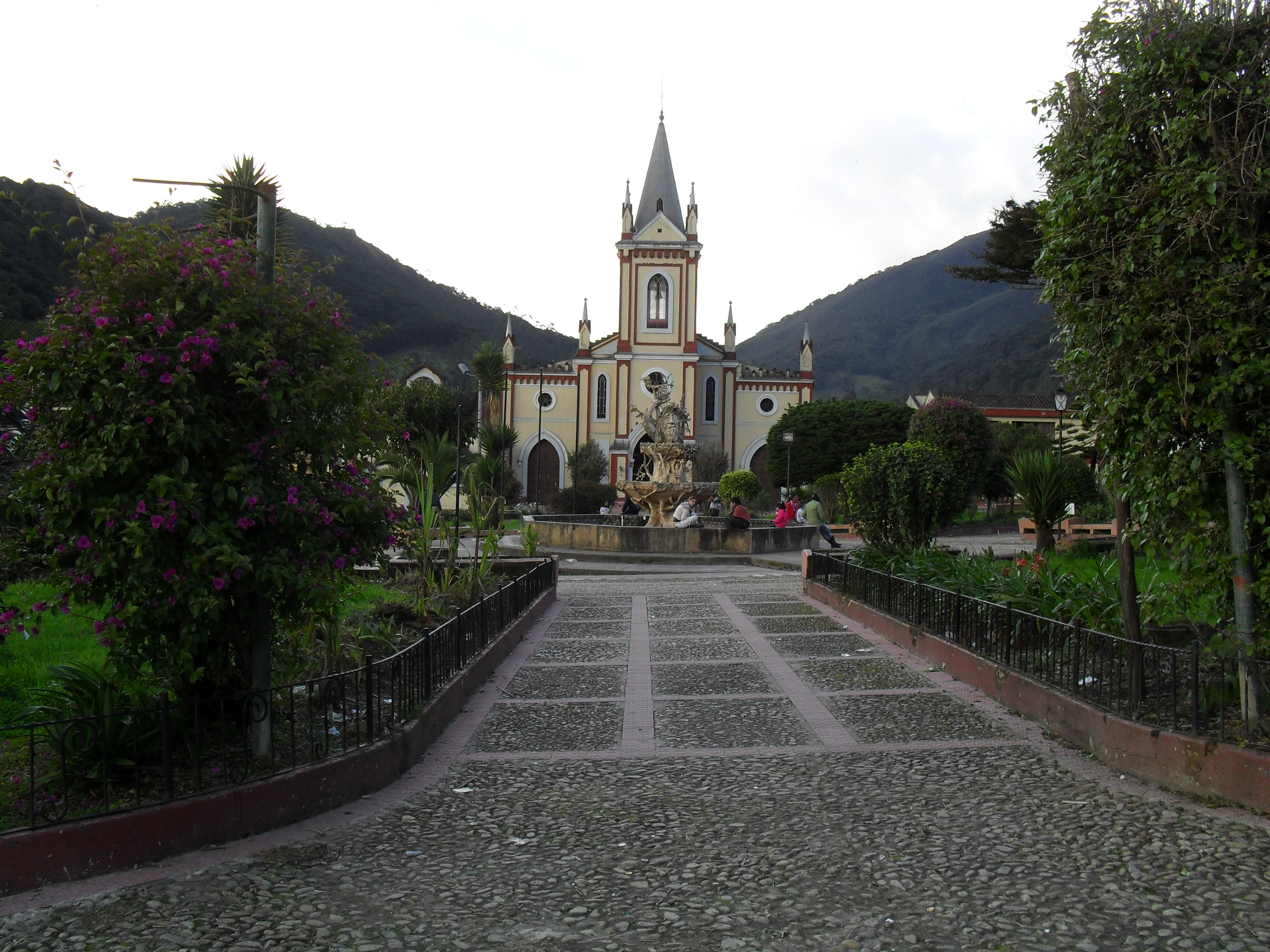
- Central square and church of Arcabuco

- Flag

- Location of the municipality and town of Arcabuco in the Boyacá Department of Colombia
- Country: Colombia
- Department: Boyacá Department
- Province: Ricaurte Province
- Founded: 22 October 1856
- Founder: Celedonio Umaña and Leopoldo Rodríguez

Government
  - Mayor: Yamith Rodrigo Rodriguez Lopez (2020–2023)

Area
  - Municipality and town: 155 km^{2} (60 sq mi)
  - Urban: 35 km^{2} (14 sq mi)
- Elevation: 2,739 m (8,986 ft)

Population (2015)
  - Municipality and town: 5,240
  - Urban: 1,961
- Time zone: UTC-5 (Colombia Standard Time)
- Website: Official website

Arcabuco is a town and municipality in the Ricaurte Province, part of the Colombian Department of Boyacá. Arcabuco is situated on the Altiplano Cundiboyacense with the urban centre at an altitude of 2,739 metres (8,986 ft). The municipality borders Moniquirá and Gámbita in the north, Villa de Leyva and Chíquiza in the south, Cómbita in the east and Gachantivá and Villa de Leyva in the west. The department capital Tunja is 34 kilometres (21 mi) to the south.

== Etymology ==
The name Arcabuco comes from Chibcha and means either "Place of the intricate scrublands" or "Place enclosed by the hills".

== History ==
The area of Arcabuco in the times before the Spanish conquest was inhabited by the Muisca. Their territory was part of the Muisca Confederation, a loose collection of rulers. Arcabuco was part of the zacazgo, with the zaque based in Hunza.

Modern Arcabuco was founded on October 22, 1856 by Celedonio Umaña and Leopoldo Rodríguez.

== Economy ==
The economy of Arcabuco is centered around agriculture and livestock farming. Apart from the agricultural products potatoes and strawberries, the town is known as a large producer of almojábanas.

== Climate ==
Arcabuco has a subtropical highland climate (Cfb) with moderate to heavy rainfall year-round.

Climate data for Arcabuco town
Month	Jan	Feb	Mar	Apr	May	Jun	Jul	Aug	Sep	Oct	Nov	Dec	Year
Mean daily maximum °C (°F)	20.2 (68.4)	20.6 (69.1)	20.6 (69.1)	19.7 (67.5)	19.0 (66.2)	18.3 (64.9)	18.1 (64.6)	18.5 (65.3)	18.8 (65.8)	18.8 (65.8)	19.3 (66.7)	19.7 (67.5)	19.3 (66.7)
Daily mean °C (°F)	13.9 (57.0)	14.4 (57.9)	14.6 (58.3)	14.6 (58.3)	14.3 (57.7)	13.7 (56.7)	13.2 (55.8)	13.4 (56.1)	13.6 (56.5)	14.0 (57.2)	14.1 (57.4)	13.8 (56.8)	14.0 (57.1)
Mean daily minimum °C (°F)	7.7 (45.9)	8.3 (46.9)	8.7 (47.7)	9.6 (49.3)	9.7 (49.5)	9.1 (48.4)	8.4 (47.1)	8.4 (47.1)	8.5 (47.3)	9.2 (48.6)	9.0 (48.2)	8.0 (46.4)	8.7 (47.7)
Average rainfall mm (inches)	123.1 (4.85)	151.3 (5.96)	221.5 (8.72)	233.2 (9.18)	176.8 (6.96)	72.2 (2.84)	62.5 (2.46)	58.2 (2.29)	107.8 (4.24)	237.6 (9.35)	225.9 (8.89)	156.4 (6.16)	1,826.5 (71.9)
Average rainy days	15	16	21	22	21	15	15	14	15	22	23	19	218
Source 1: IDEAM
Source 2: Climate-Data.org

== Named after Arcabuco ==
- Arcabuco Formation, Late Jurassic to Early Cretaceous dinosaur tracks-containing geologic formation

== Born in Arcabuco ==
- Cayetano Sarmiento, professional cyclist

== Gallery ==
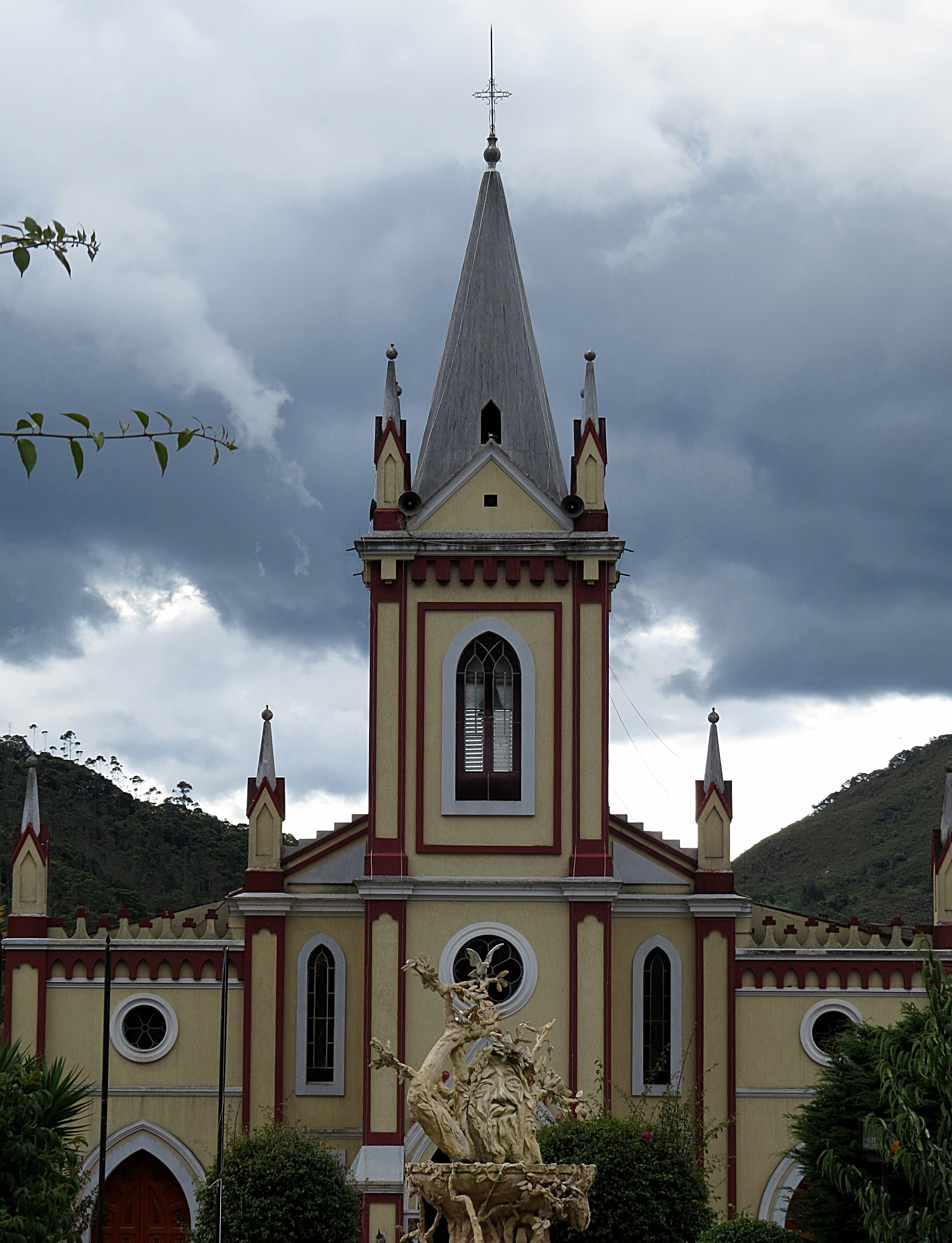
Church of Arcabuco

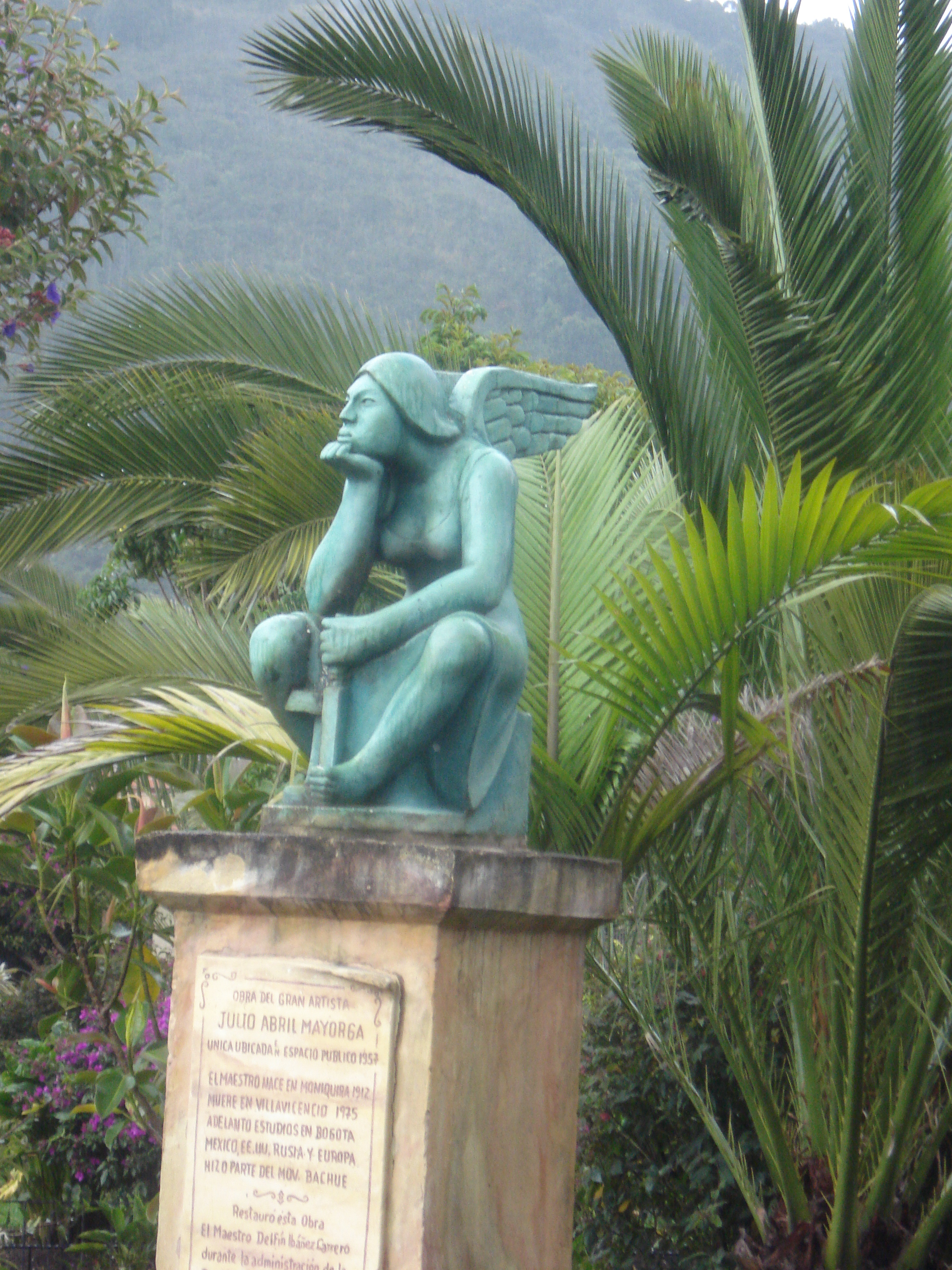
Sculpture in Arcabuco

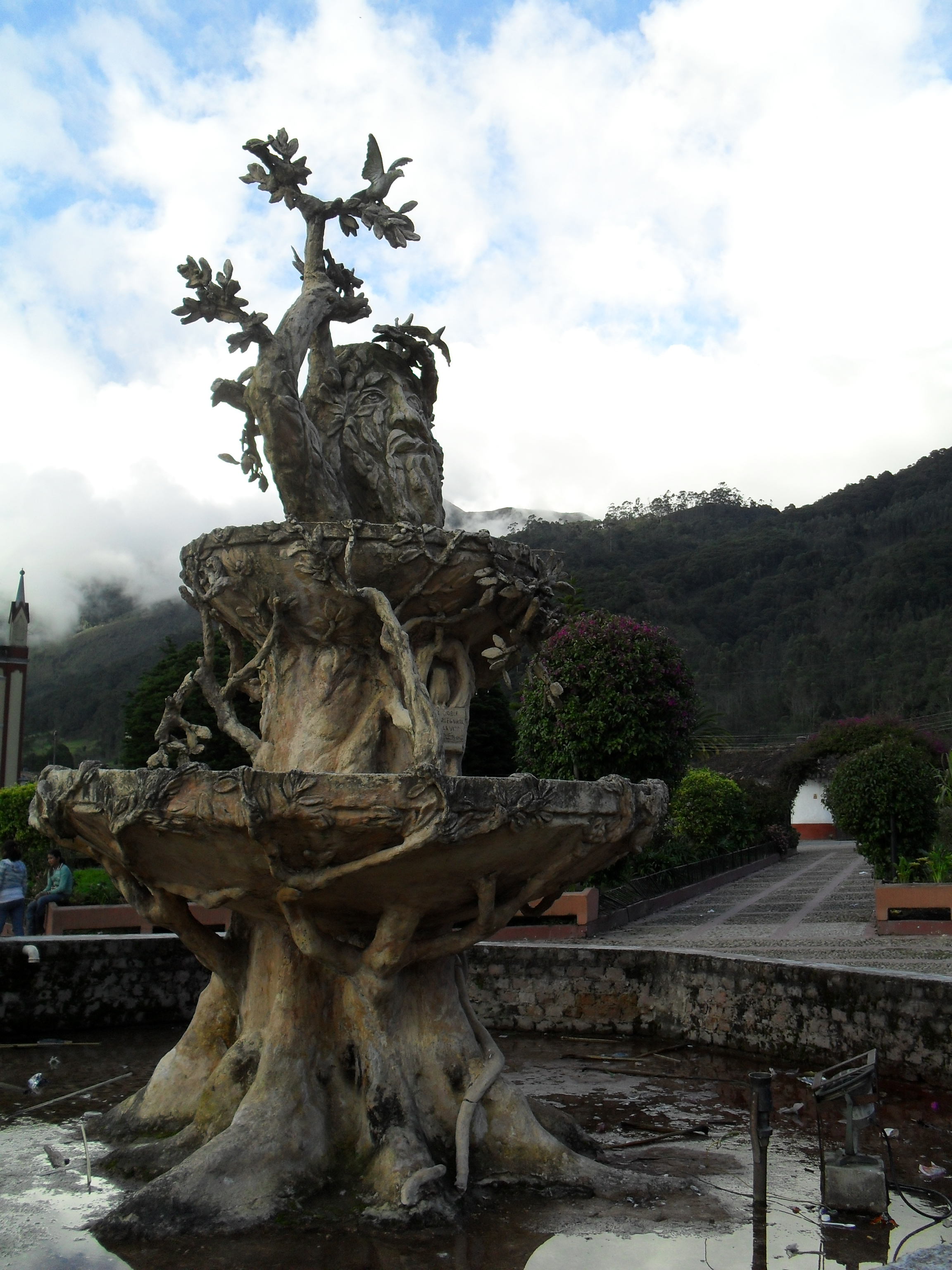
Monument in Arcabuco

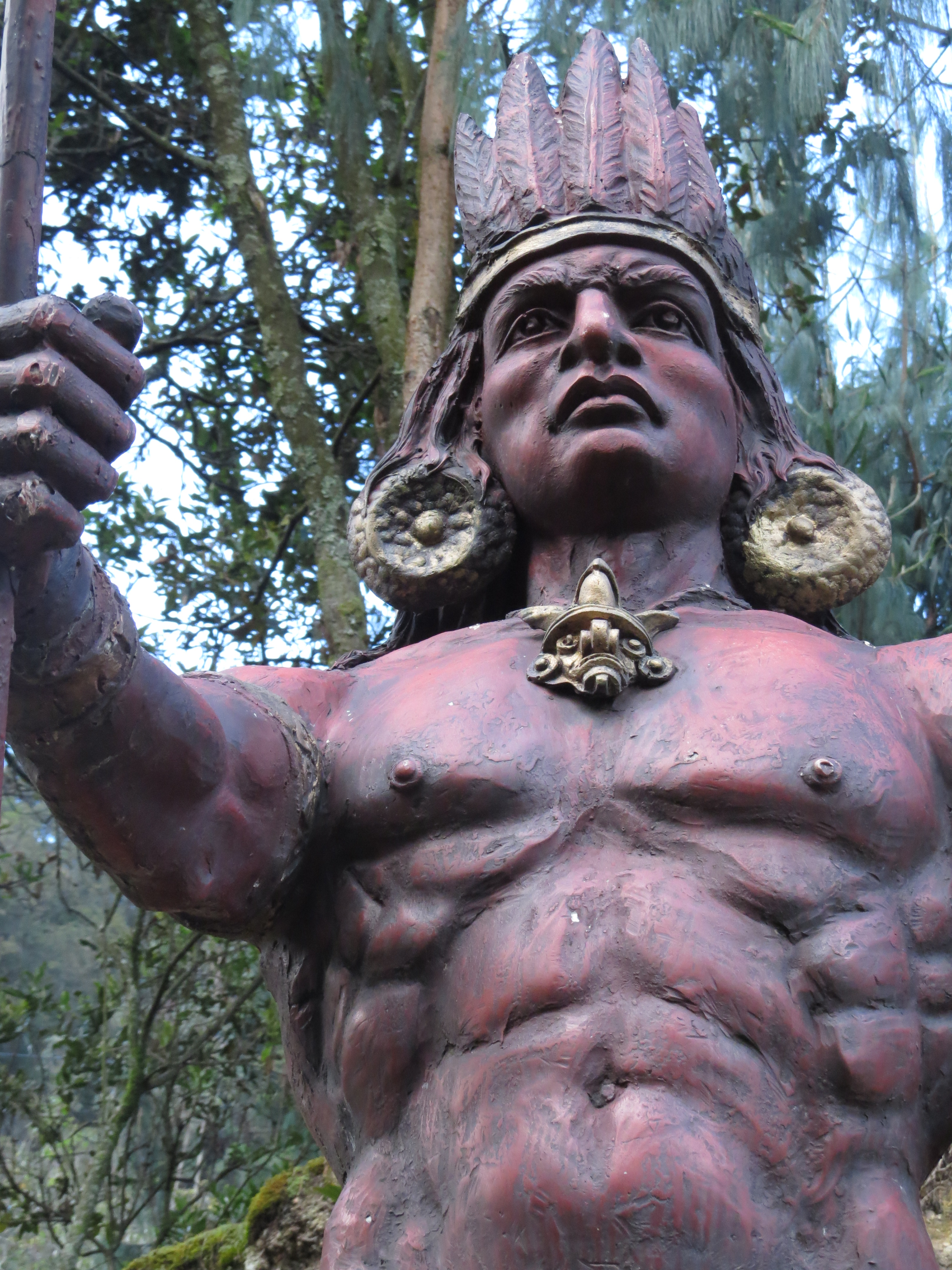
Statue honouring the Muisca
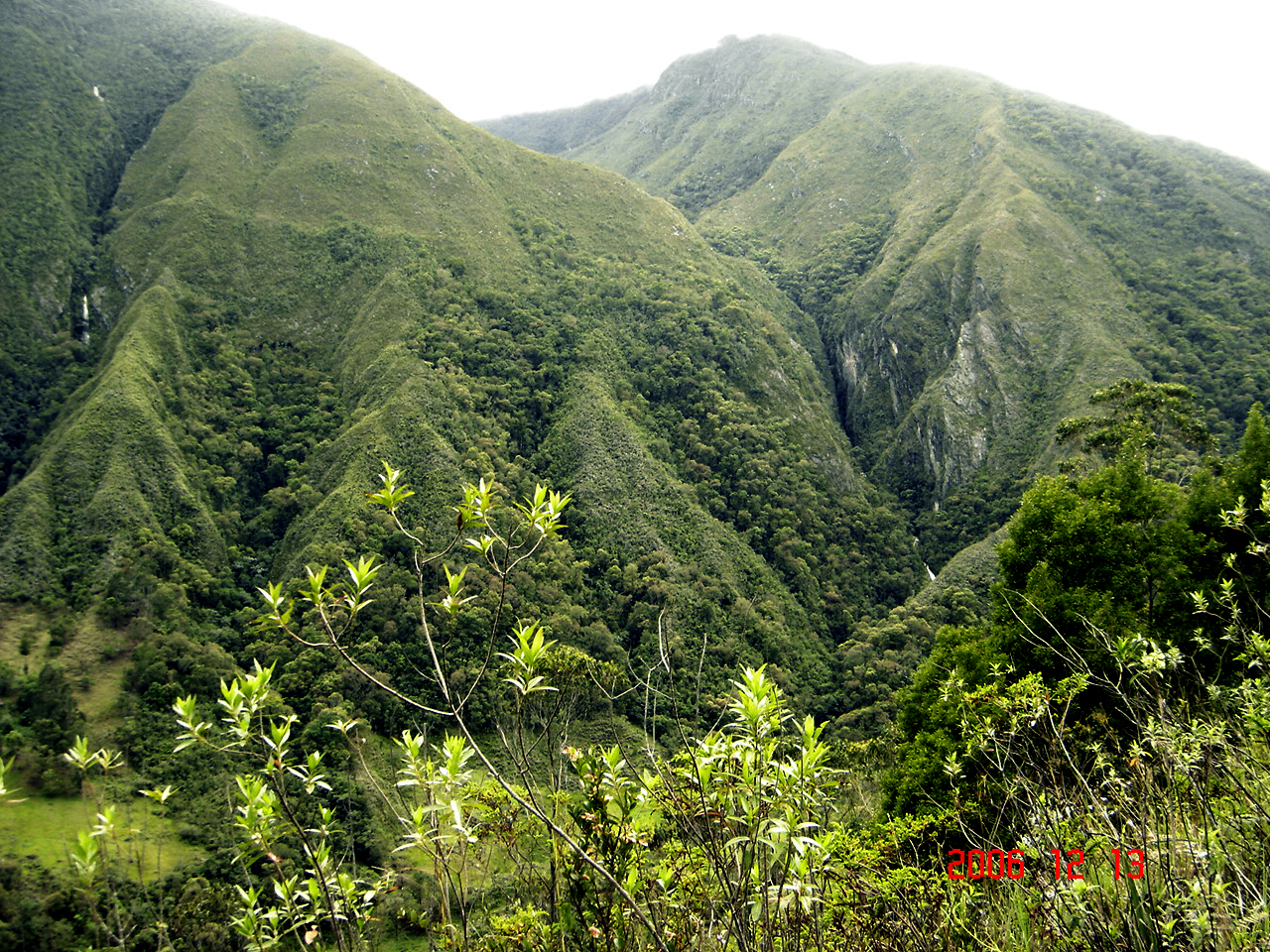
Hills in rural Arcabuco

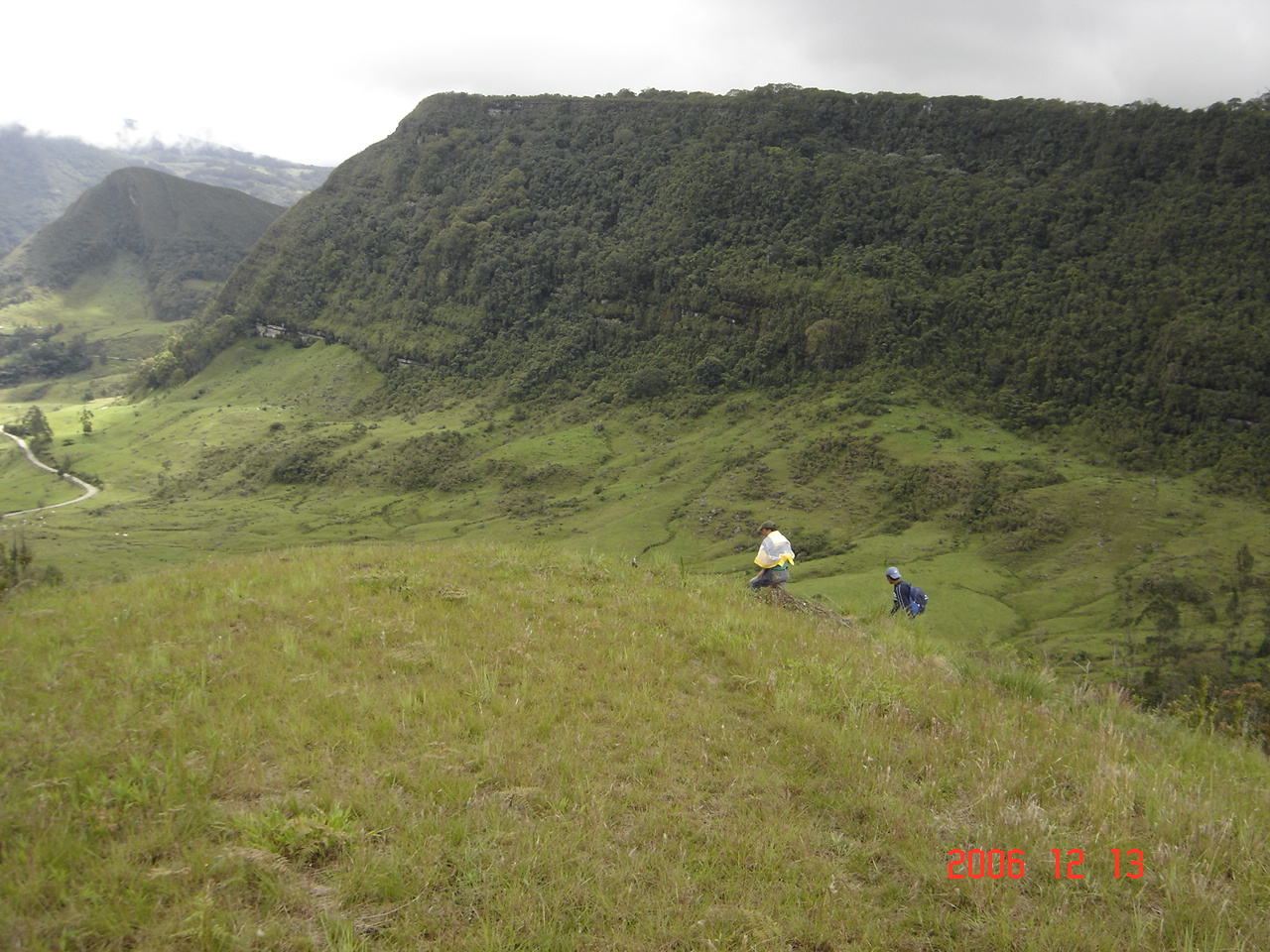
Rural Arcabuco

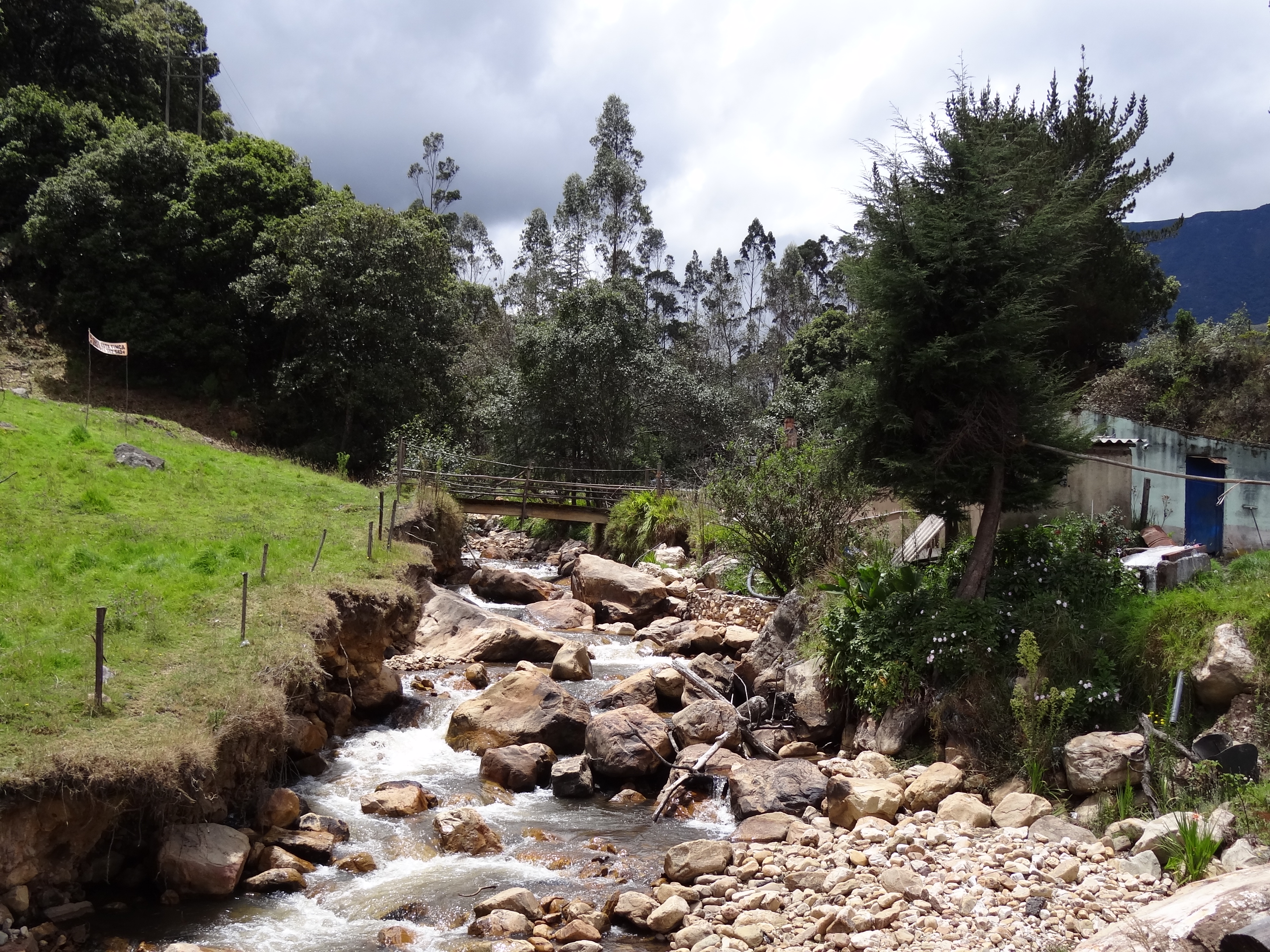
Arcabuco River

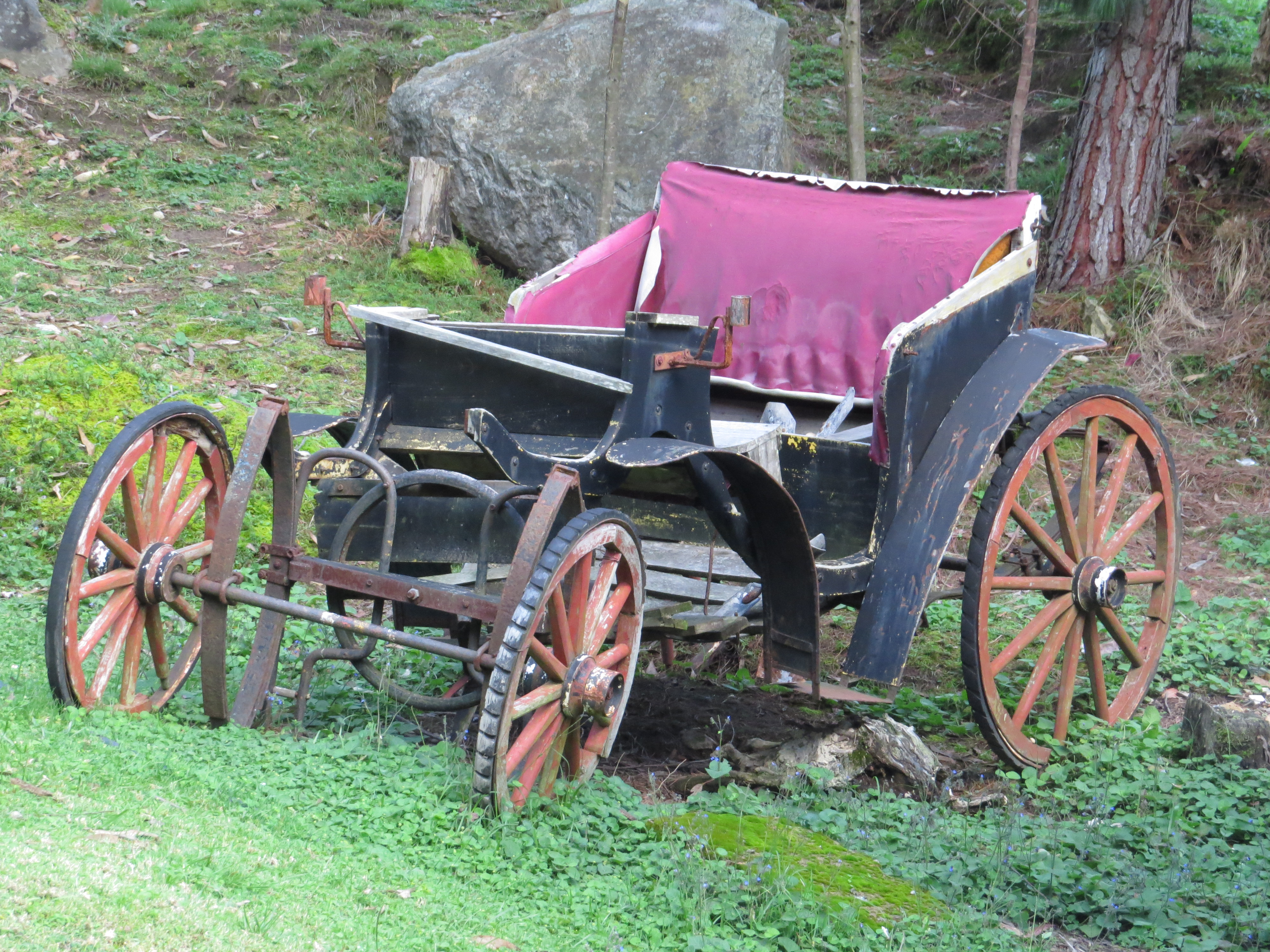
Old car in rural Arcabuco
