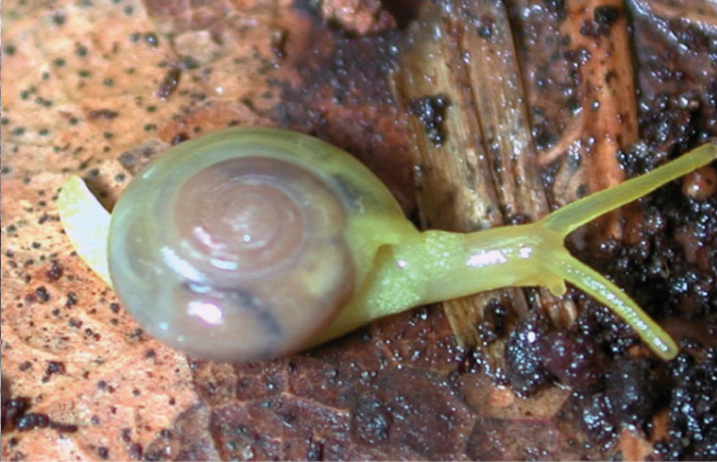
- Tamayoa decolorata

Scientific classification
- Kingdom: Animalia
- Phylum: Mollusca
- Class: Gastropoda
- Order: Stylommatophora
- Suborder: Scolodontina
- Superfamily: Scolodontoidea
- Family: Scolodontidae; H. B. Baker, 1925

= Scolodontidae =

Family of gastropods

Scolodontidae is a taxonomic family of air-breathing land snails, terrestrial pulmonate gastropod mollusks in the superfamily Scolodontoidea and suborder Scolodontina.

== Taxonomy ==
The following genera are recognised in the family Scolodontidae:

- Polygyratia Gray, 1847
- Ridleyconcha Christensen, 2020

Scolodontinae

- Drepanostomella Bourguignat, 1889
- Happia Bourguignat, 1889 - synonym: Ammonoceras L. Pfeiffer, 1855
- Hirtudiscus Hylton Scott, 1973
- Scolodonta Doering, 1875 - type genus of the family Scolodontidae - synonym: Wayampia Tillier, 1980
- Systrophia L. Pfeiffer, 1855
- Zilchistrophia Weyrauch, 1960

Tamayoinae

- Guestieria Crosse H., 1872
- Happiella H. B. Baker, 1925 - synonym: Occultator Pilsbry, 1926
- Microhappia Thiele, 1927
- Miradiscops Baker, 1925
- Tamayoa H. B. Baker, 1925 - type genus of the subfamily Tamayoinae

Genera brought into synonymy

- Ammonoceras L. Pfeiffer, 1855: synonym of Happia Bourguignat, 1890 (non Lamarck, 1822)
- Entodina Ancey, 1887: synonym of Systrophia (Entodina) Ancey, 1887 represented as Systrophia L. Pfeiffer, 1855 (original rank)
- Occultator Pilsbry, 1926: synonym of Happiella H. B. Baker, 1925
- Ophiogyra Albers, 1850: synonym of Polygyratia Gray, 1847 (objective junior synonym)
- Ridleya Ancey, 1901: synonym of Ridleyconcha Christensen, 2020 (invalid: junior homonym of Ridleya Delage & Hérouard, 1899 [Porifera]; Ridleyconcha is a replacement name)
- Wayampia Tillier, 1980: synonym of Scolodonta Doering, 1875
