= Tenza Valley =

Valley in Colombia

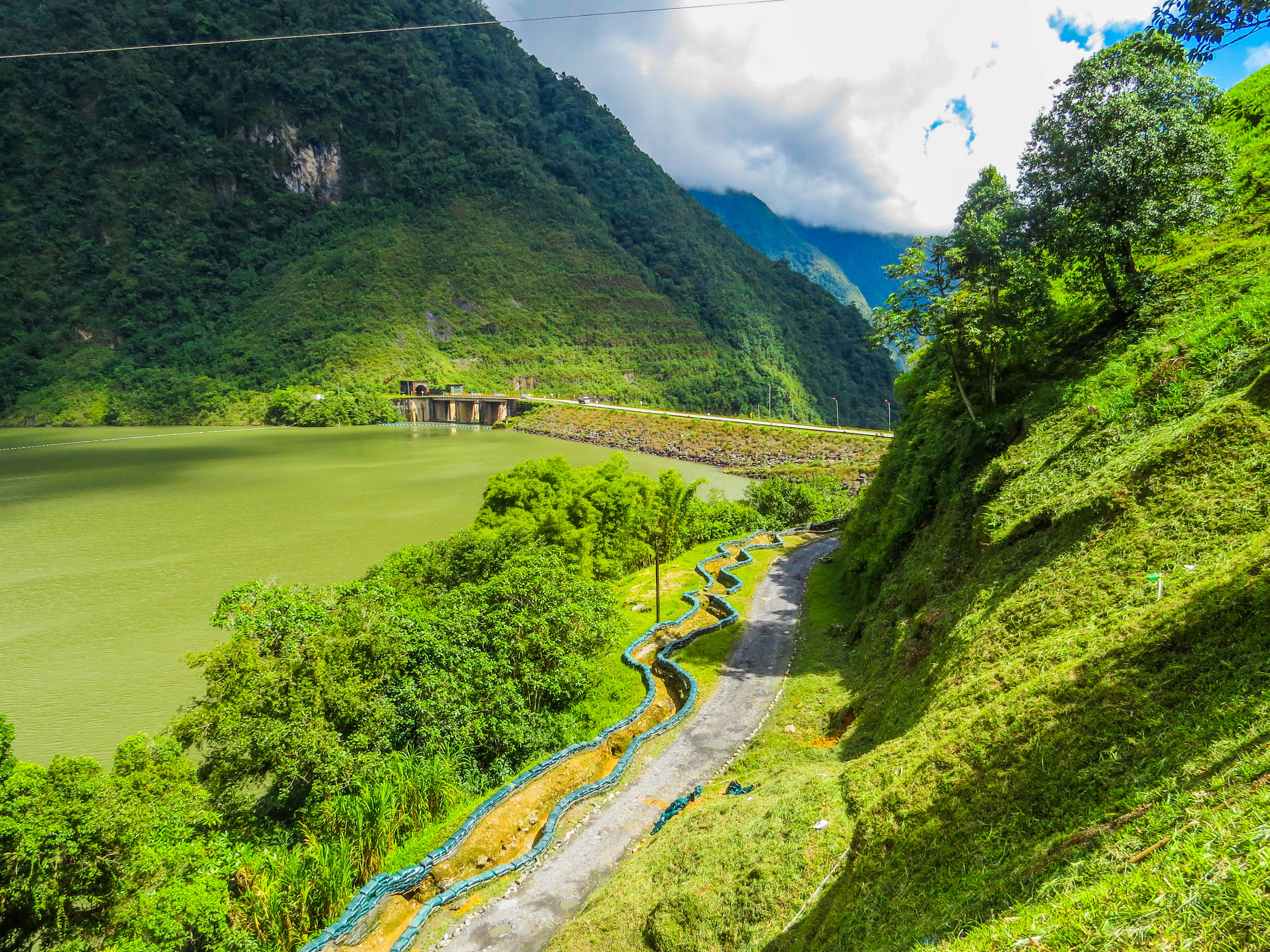
- Chivor Reservoir and Dam in the Tenza Valley

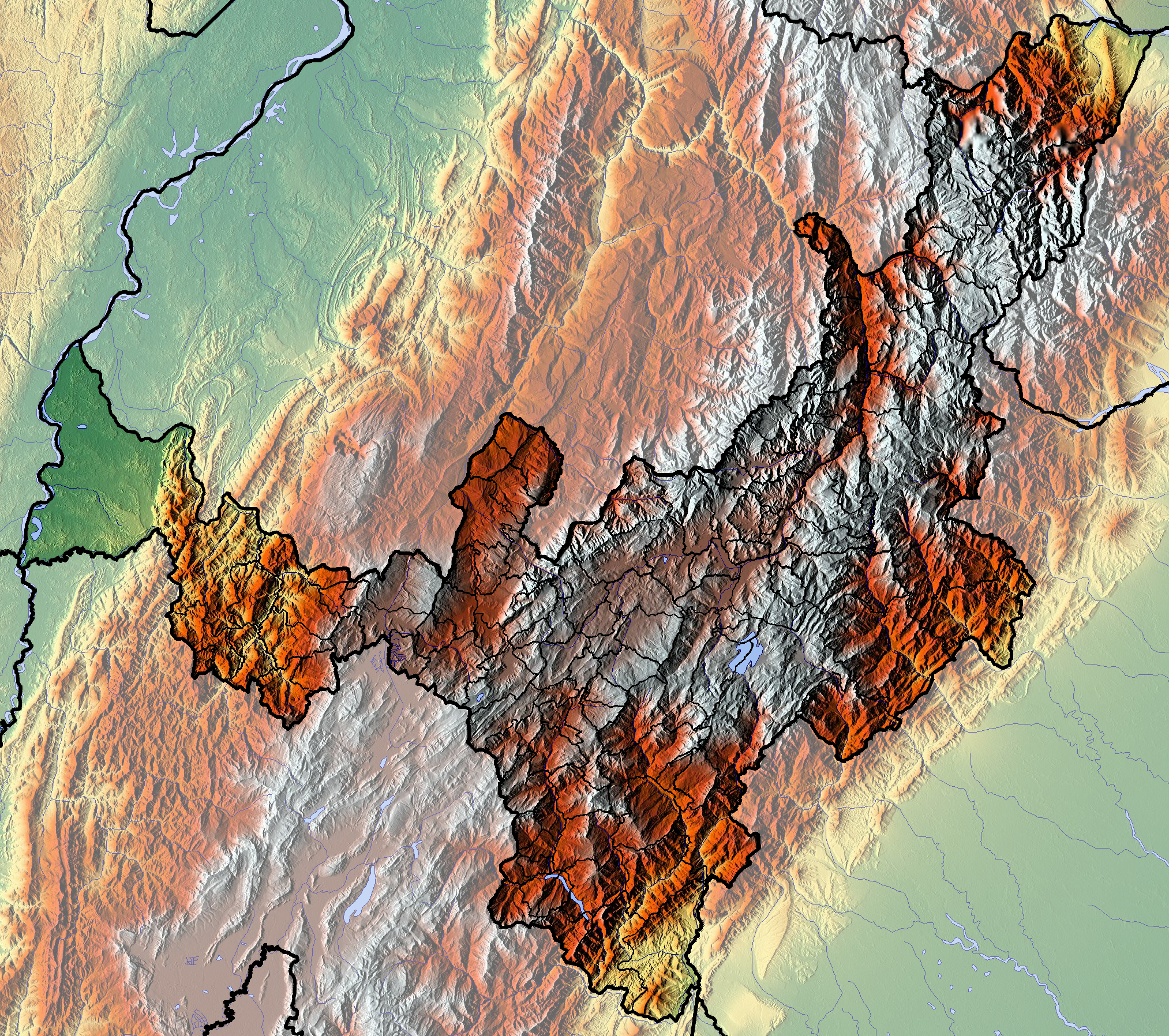
- Topographical map of Boyacá; Tenza Valley is located in the south the elongated Chivor Reservoir is inside the valley
- Floor elevation: 395–2,095 m (1,296–6,873 ft)

Geology
- Type: Valley

Geography
- Location: Eastern Ranges
- Country: Colombia
- State: Cundinamarca, Boyacá
- Population centers: Tenza; Garagoa; Sutatenza
- Coordinates: 5°05′00″N 73°25′00″W
- River: Lengupá

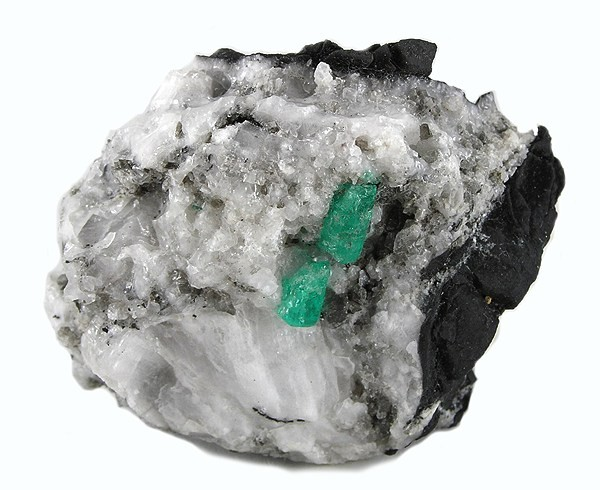
The emeralds of Chivor and Somondoco were already mined in the time of the Muisca

The Tenza Valley (Spanish: Valle de Tenza) is an intermontane valley in the Eastern Ranges of the Colombian Andes. The valley stretches over the southeastern part of the department of Boyacá and the northeastern part of Cundinamarca. It is located east of the Altiplano Cundiboyacense and in the time before the Spanish conquest of the Muisca, as the Altiplano was inhabited by the Muisca in the higher altitudes and the Tegua in the lower areas to the east.

== Etymology ==
The Tenza Valley is named after Tenza which means in Chibcha: "Behind the mouth" or "Going down at night".

== Geography and geology ==
The Tenza Valley is situated in the Eastern Ranges of the Colombian Andes at altitudes between approximately 2,100 metres (6,900 ft) in the northwest and 400 metres (1,300 ft) in the southeast. The Lengupá River, part of the Orinoco drainage basin, flows through the valley and connects the higher altitude Altiplano Cundiboyacense with the Llanos Orientales. The Une, Villeta, Socha, Macanal and Bogotá Formations outcrop in the valley. The valley is rich in water. The average temperature is 20 °C (68 °F).

== History ==
The Tenza Valley was inhabited by the Muisca before the conquistador Gonzalo Jiménez de Quesada entered the central highlands of Colombia. The Tenza Valley was ruled by a cacique who was loyal to the zaque based in Hunza, present-day Tunja. On the fertile lands of the valley indigenous people elaborated their agriculture. The valley was also important in the economy of the Muisca, hosting the important emerald resources of Chivor and Somondoco.

Archaeologist Juanita Sáenz Samper has discovered three agricultural terraces and five cemeteries hosting one grave and pertaining to pre-Columbian times. The research in the Tenza Valley has also uncovered typical grey ceramics of the area, called Valle de Tenza Gris.

=== Modern times ===
The Chivor Reservoir, producing 8% of Colombia's hydroelectric energy, is located in the Tenza Valley. Despite the pleasant climate compared to the colder regions of Boyacá, the Tenza Valley is not touristic.

== Economy ==
The temperate climate of the Tenza Valley allows for a variety in agriculture. Main products cultivated are maize, yuca, potatoes, papa criolla, sugarcane, tomatoes, bananas, coffee, fique, arracacha, peas, beans, cucumbers, pumpkins, mangoes, chirimoya, oranges, avocadoes, pineapples, mandarines, papayas, maracuyá, guayaba and lulo.

In terms of mining, the emerald mines of Chivor and Somondoco are important. Coal mines and gold extraction form another part of the mining business in the valley. Salt is mined on a minor scale in Sutatenza and gypsum is exploited in Macanal.

== Municipalities in the Tenza Valley ==
Municipality	Department	Ruler(s)	Altitude urban centre (m)	Surface area (km^{2})	Remarks	Map
Tenza	Boyacá	cacique	1600	51	Namesake of the valley	
Almeida	Boyacá	zaque	1925	57.98	Hydroelectric plant of the Chivor Reservoir	
La Capilla	Boyacá	zaque	1750	57.26		
Chinavita	Boyacá	zaque	1763	148		
Chivor	Boyacá	cacique	1800	108.36	Important emerald mines	
Garagoa	Boyacá	zaque	1650	191.75	Seat of the Diocese (Catholic Church)	
Guateque	Boyacá	cacique	1815	36.04		
Guayatá	Boyacá	cacique	1767	112	Famous for its bread rolls (mogollas)	
Macanal	Boyacá	zaque	1680	199.5	Gypsum mining	
Pachavita	Boyacá	zaque	1985	68		
Somondoco	Boyacá	zaque	1670	58.7	Emerald mines	
Sutatenza	Boyacá	zaque	1890	41.26	Minor salt mining	
Manta	Cundinamarca	cacique	1924	105	Possible birthplace of Jorge Eliécer Gaitán, assassinated in 1948	
Machetá	Cundinamarca	zaque	2094	229.35		
Tibiritá	Cundinamarca	zaque	1980	57.2		
Santa María	Boyacá	Tegua	850	326.44		
San Luis de Gaceno	Boyacá	Tegua	395	458.5		

== See also ==
- Eastern Hills
- Muisca
- Altiplano Cundiboyacense, Bogotá savanna, Tegua, Colombian emeralds
