= Guayatá =

Coordinates: 4°58′N 73°29′W

- Municipality and town
- Flag

- Location of the municipality and town of Guayatá in the Boyacá Department of Colombia
- Country: Colombia
- Department: Boyacá Department
- Province: Eastern Boyacá Province
- Founded: 6 April 1821
- Founder: Andrés José Medina Narciso

Government
  - Mayor: John Santiago Ruíz Alfonso (2020-2023)

Area
  - Municipality and town: 112 km^{2} (43 sq mi)
- Elevation: 1,767 m (5,797 ft)

Population (2015)
  - Municipality and town: 5,126
  - Density: 45.8/km^{2} (119/sq mi)
  - Urban: 1,302
- Demonym: Guayatuno/a
- Time zone: UTC-5 (Colombia Standard Time)
- Website: Official website

Guayatá is a town and municipality in the Eastern Boyacá Province, part of the Colombian department of Boyacá. Guayatá is situated on the Altiplano Cundiboyacense at distances of 129 kilometres (80 mi) from the department capital Tunja and 132 kilometres (82 mi) from the national capital Bogotá. The urban centre is located at an altitude of 1,767 metres (5,797 ft) and the altitude ranges from 1,270 metres (4,170 ft) to 3,080 metres (10,100 ft).

== Borders ==
- North with Guateque
- West with Manta, Cundinamarca
- South with Gachetá and Ubalá, Cundinamarca
- East with Somondoco and Chivor

== Etymology ==
The name Guayatá comes from Chibcha and is either a combination of tá; "land over there" or "farmfields" and Guaya, a creek running through Tenza or from Guaitá; "domain of the female cacique".

== History ==
In the times before the Spanish conquest of the central highlands of the Colombian Andes, the area around Guayatá was inhabited by the Muisca. Organized in their loose Muisca Confederation, they were an advanced agricultural civilization. Within present-day Guayatá cotton was cultivated, important for the mantle making of the Muisca. Also feathers of hunted birds were traded in and around Guayatá.

At the time of the arrival of the Spanish conquistadores, in Guayatá money was found that consisted of small pieces of cloth, gold or emeralds. The golden disks used as money were not decorated yet plain. Knowledge about the Muisca in the early colonial period has been provided by friar Pedro Simón.

Modern Guayatá was founded on April 6, 1821, by Andrés José Medina Narciso; months before the dissolution of the Spanish colonial period and independence of the Republic of Gran Colombia.

== Economy ==
Principal economic activity of Guayatá is agriculture, mainly maize, arracacha, bananas, yuca, beans, potatoes, coffee, pumpkins and peas. Famous product of Guayatá are the bread rolls (mogollas).

== Trivia ==
- Market day: Tuesday
- Median temperature: 19 °C
- DANE code: 15325

== Born in Guayatá ==
- Roberto "Pajarito" Buitrago, former professional cyclist
