= Eastern Boyacá Province =

Eastern Boyacá Province Provincia de Boyacá Oriente
- Province
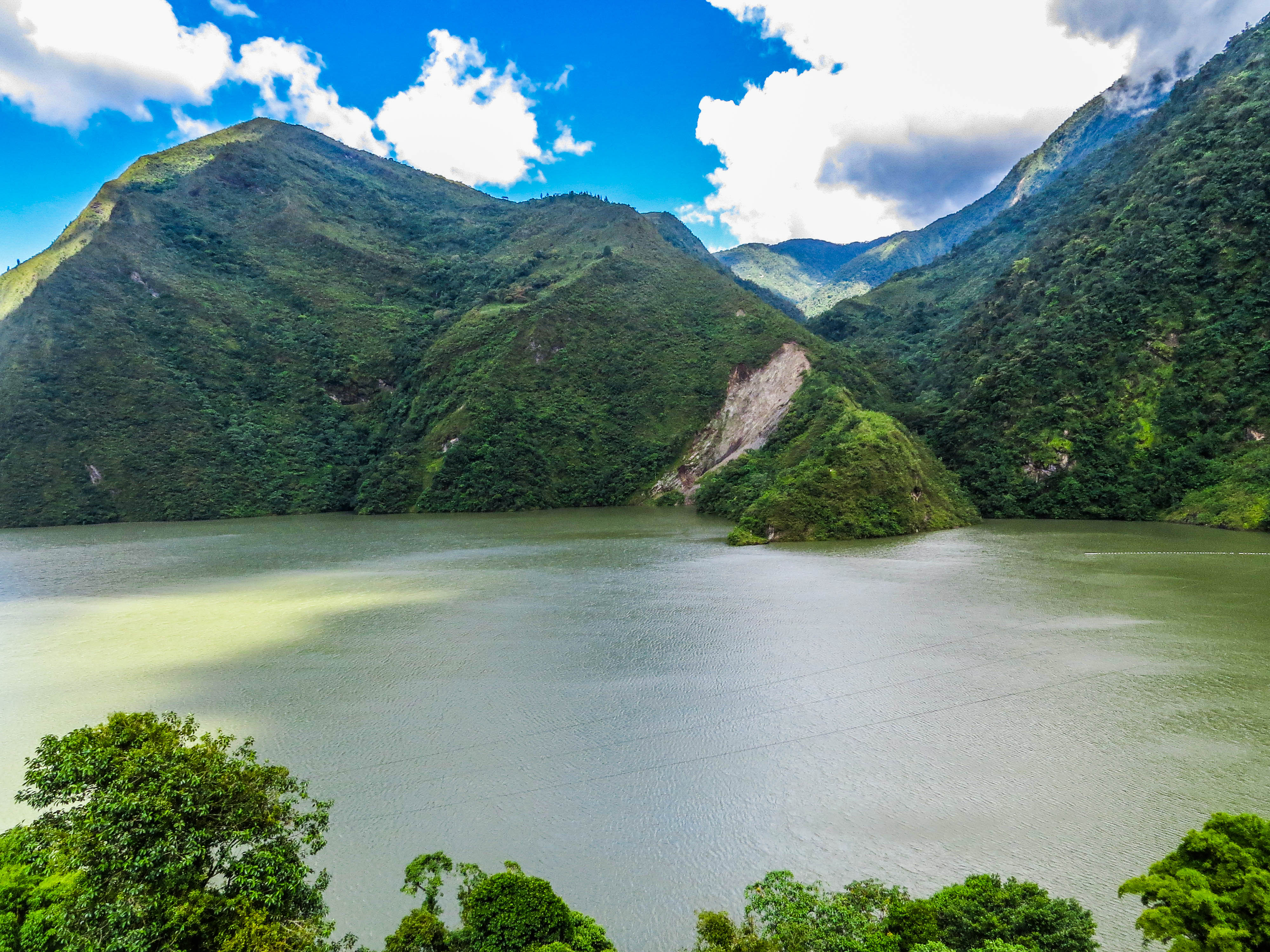
- Emerald Reservoir in Chivor

- Location of Eastern Boyacá Province in Colombia
- Coordinates: 5°00′20″N 73°28′20″W
- Country: Colombia
- Department: Boyacá
- Capital: Guateque
- Municipalities: 8

Area
  - Total: 530 km^{2} (200 sq mi)
- Time zone: UTC−5 (COT)
- Indigenous groups: Muisca

The Eastern Boyacá Province is a province of the Colombian Department of Boyacá. The province is formed by 8 municipalities. The Tenza Valley is located in the Eastern Boyacá Province. The province hosts the eastern belt containing rich emerald deposits.

== Municipalities ==
Almeida • Chivor • Guateque • Guayatá • La Capilla • Somondoco • Sutatenza • Tenza
