= La Capilla =

La Capilla La Capilla de Tenza
- Municipality and town
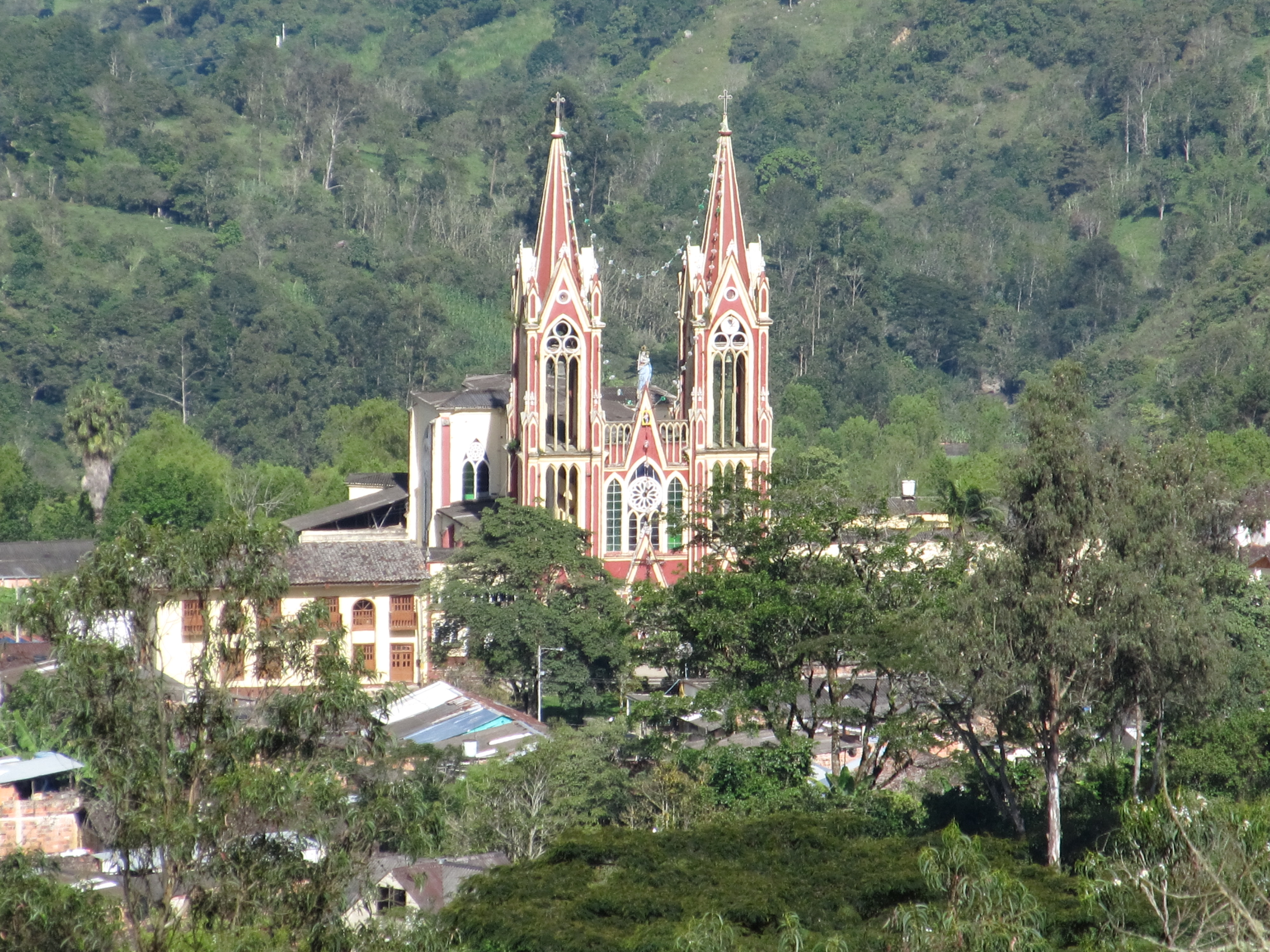
- View of La Capilla

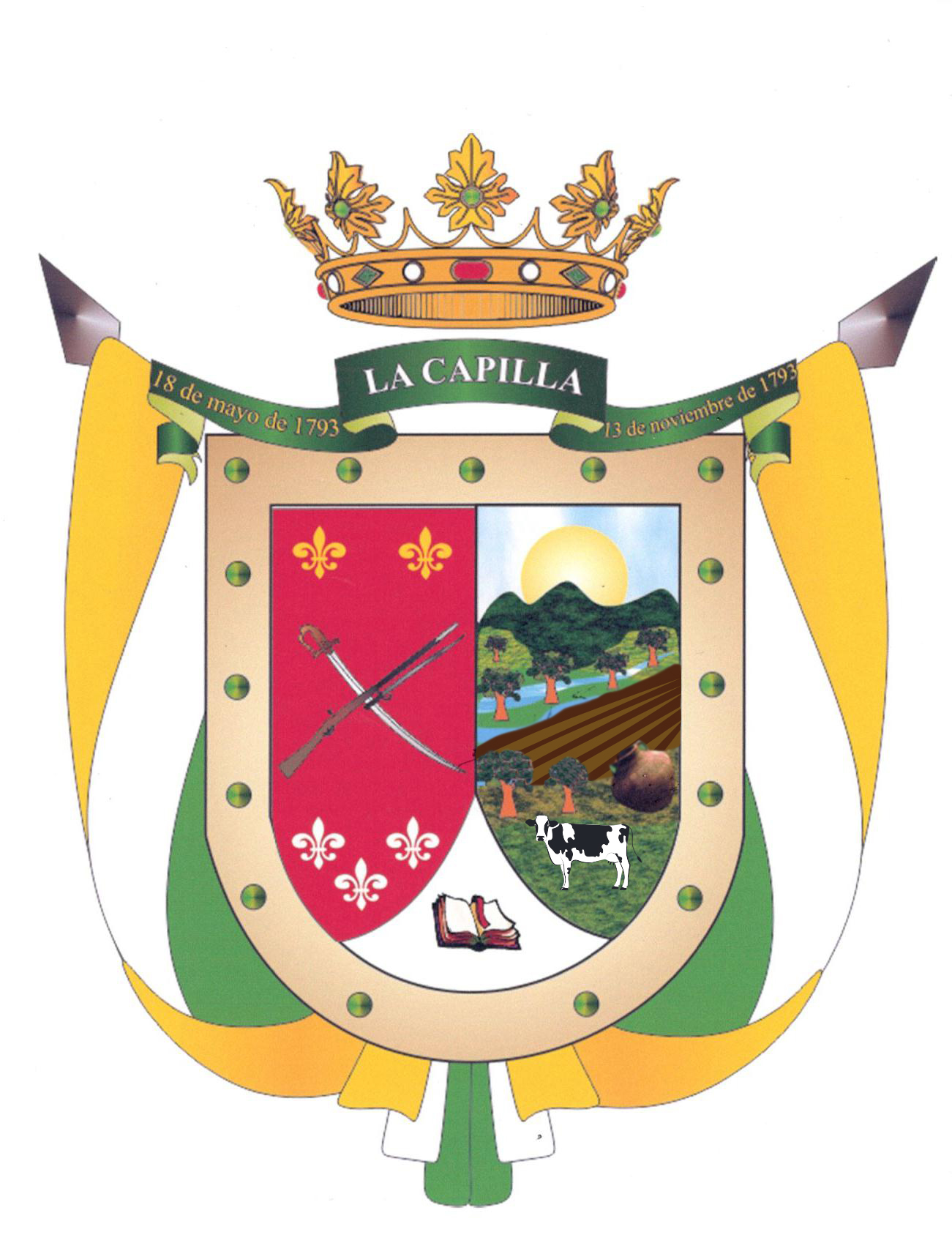
- Flag Coat of arms

- Location of the municipality and town of La Capilla in the Boyacá Department of Colombia
- Coordinates: 5°05′44″N 73°26′37″W
- Country: Colombia
- Department: Boyacá Department
- Province: Eastern Boyacá Province
- Founded: 13 November 1793
- Founder: Juan de la Cruz Aguirre

Government
  - Mayor: Raúl Hernando Rodríguez Chavarro (2020-2023)

Area
  - Municipality and town: 57.26 km^{2} (22.11 sq mi)
- Elevation: 1,600 m (5,200 ft)

Population (2015)
  - Municipality and town: 2,550
  - Density: 44.5/km^{2} (115/sq mi)
  - Urban: 972
- Time zone: UTC-5 (Colombia Standard Time)
- Website: Official website

La Capilla is a town and municipality in the Eastern Boyacá Province, part of the Colombian department of Boyacá. The urban centre is situated at an altitude of 1,600 metres (5,200 ft) in the Tenza Valley.

== Borders ==
- North with Úmbita and Pachavita
- South with Tenza and Cundinamarca
- West with Cundinamarca
- East with Pachavita and Tenza

== Etymology ==
La Capilla was originally called La Capilla de Tenza, after the Our Lady of Candle appeared in the outskirts of the village. Because of this, a chapel was built; hence the name Capilla.

== History ==
The first inhabitants of the region of La Capilla were the Muisca, who were organised in their loose Muisca Confederation. The people of the area of La Capilla were loyal to the caciques of Garagoa, Sutatenza and Somondoco in the Tenza Valley. Conquistador Gonzalo Jiménez de Quesada and his troops passed through this valley in 1537, on their way to the domains of the zaque of Hunza. Modern La Capilla was founded on November 13, 1793, by Juan de la Cruz Aguirre.

== Economy ==
Main economical activity of La Capilla is agriculture, with cucumbers, tomatoes and beans cultivated.

== Other characteristics ==
- Market Day: Monday
- Distance from Tunja: 92 kilometres (57 mi)
- Median temperature: 18 °C (64 °F)
- Demonym: Capillense

== Gallery ==
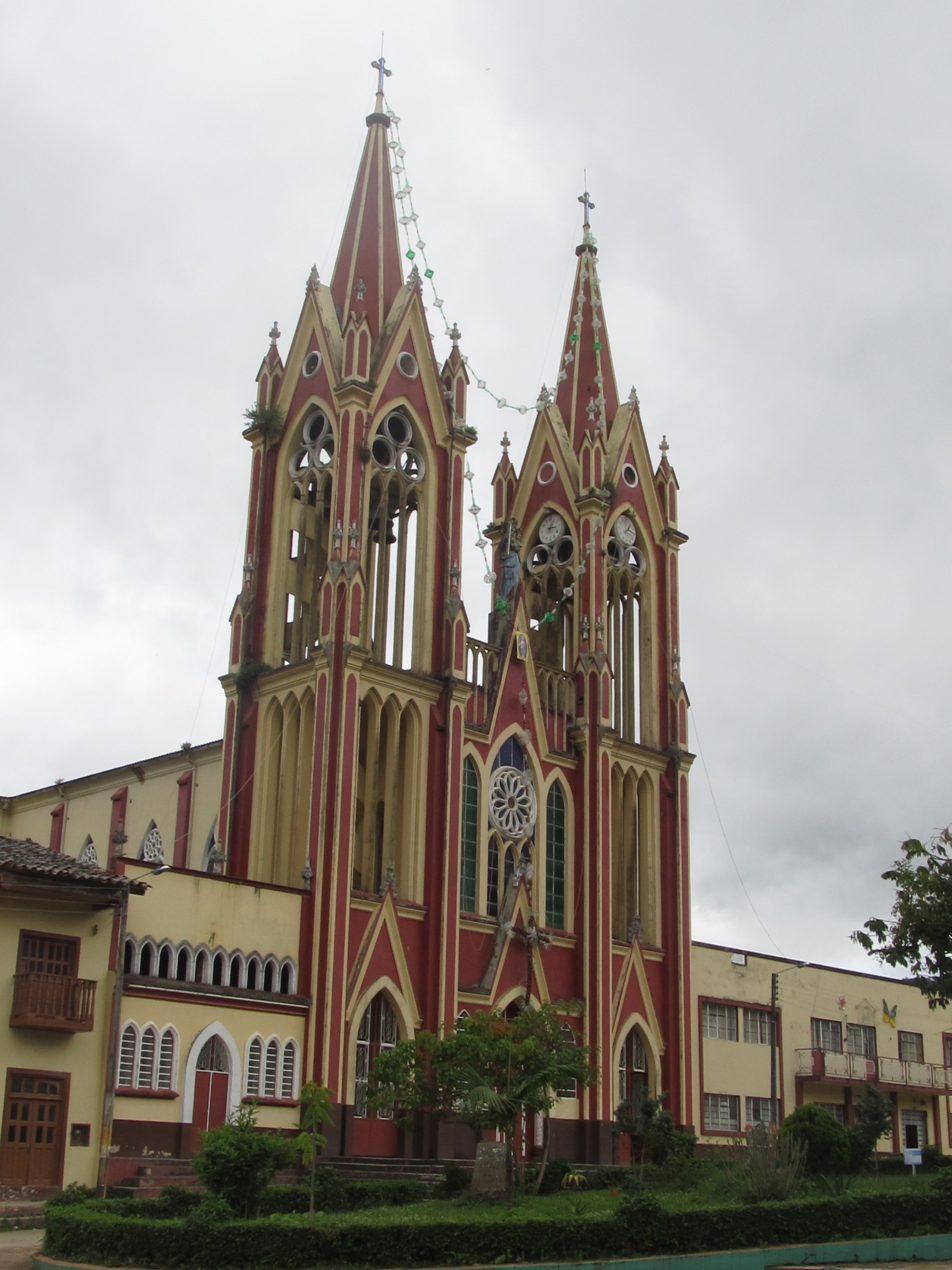
Church

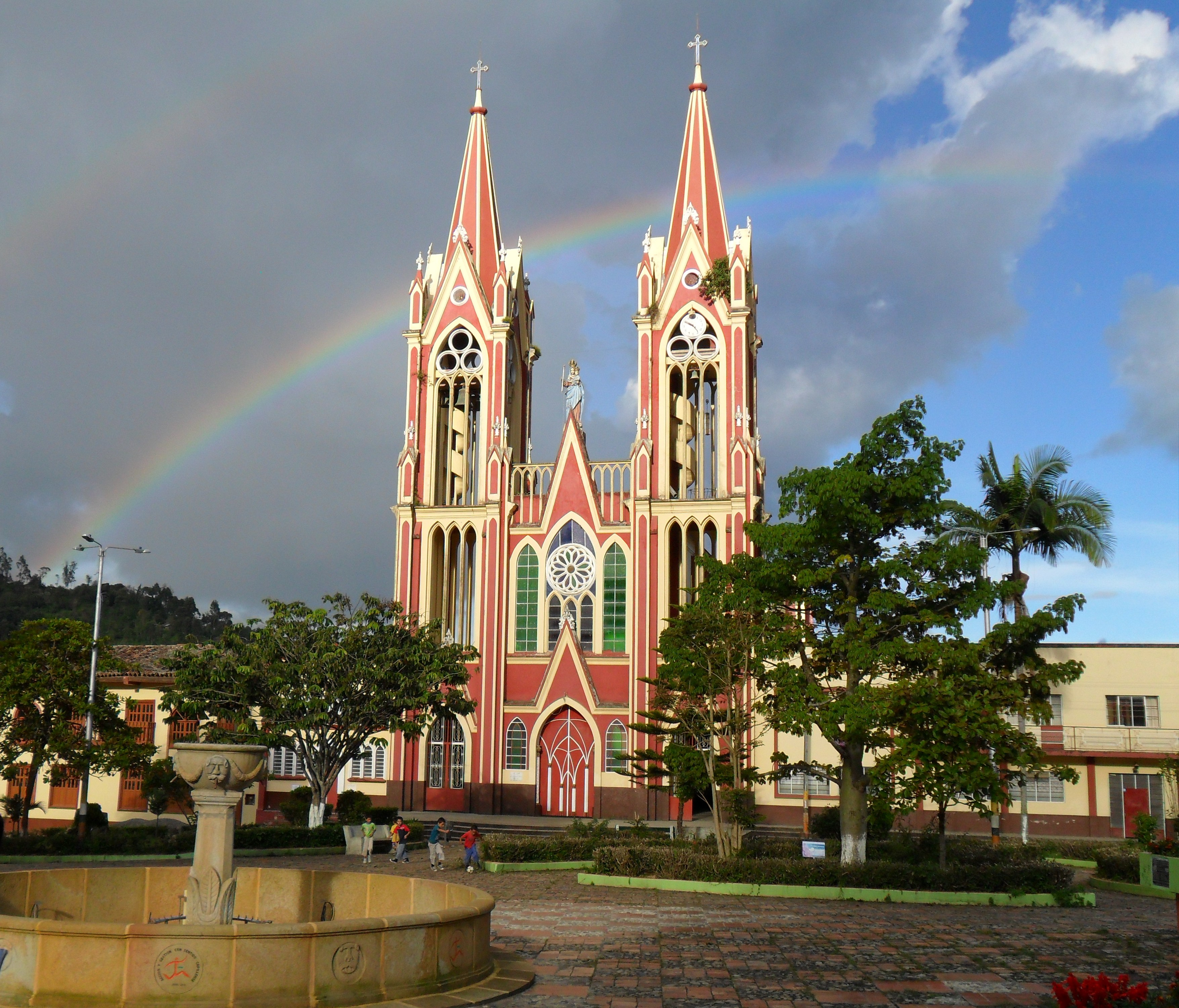
Church with Cuchavira

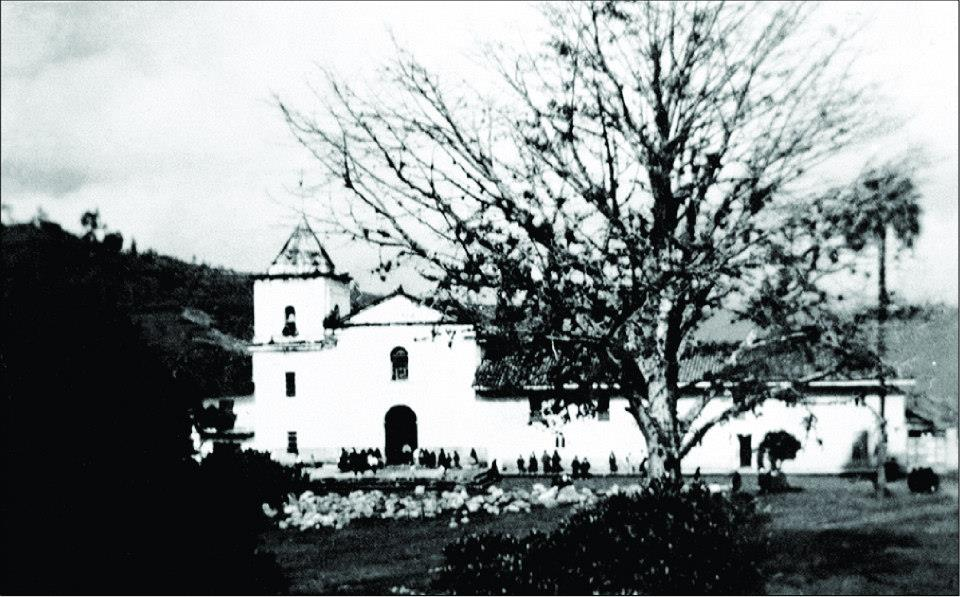
The old chapel, namesake of La Capilla
1929

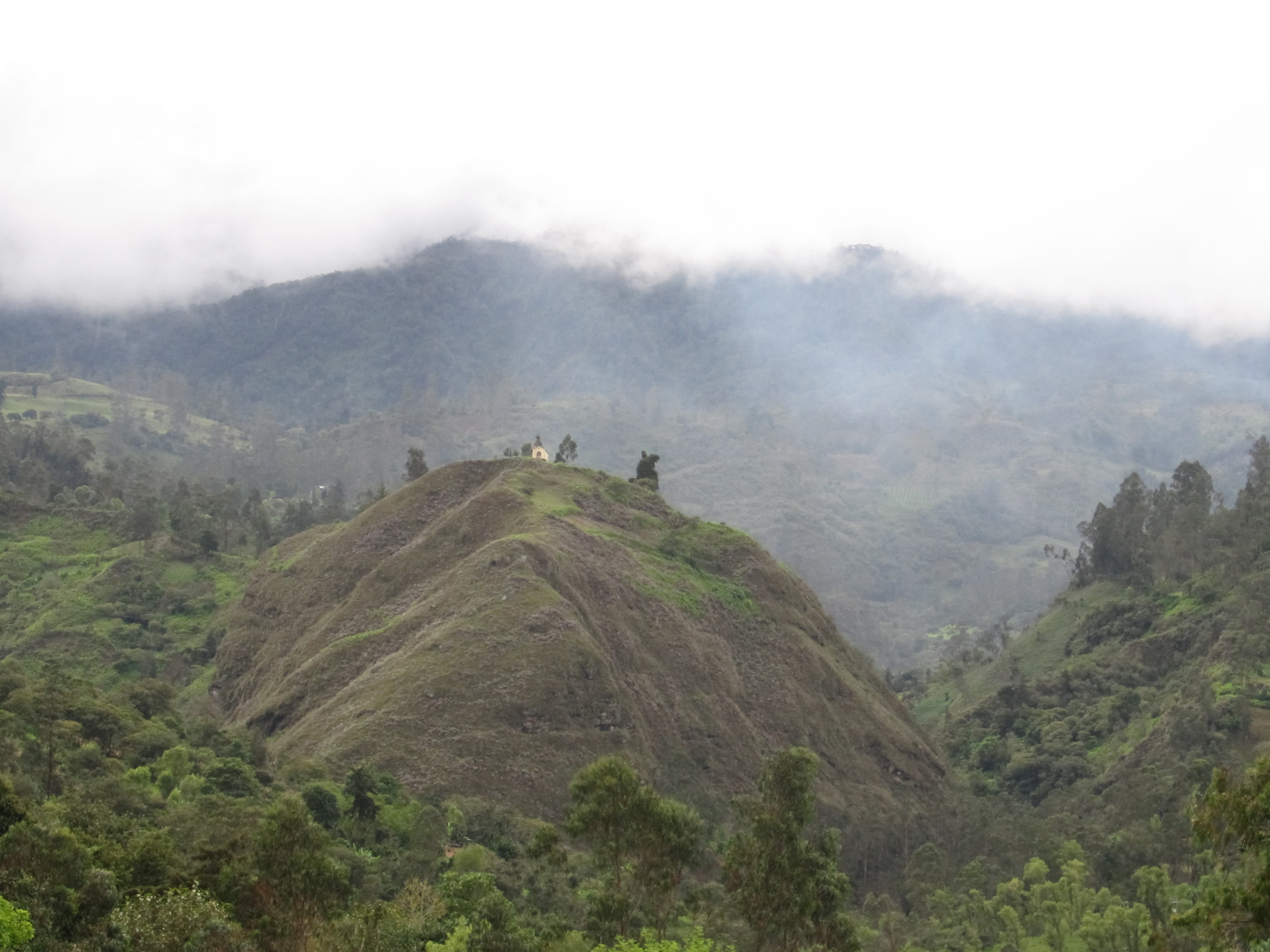
Peña de la Virgen hill
