= Macanal =

Coordinates: 4°58′19″N 73°19′10″W

- Municipality and town
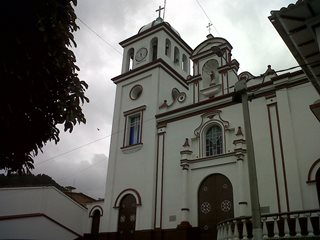
- Church of Macanal

- Flag

- Location of the municipality and town of Macanal in the Boyacá Department of Colombia
- Country: Colombia
- Department: Boyacá Department
- Province: Neira Province
- Founded: 4 May 1807

Government
  - Mayor: Javier Andrés Solano Rojas (2020-2023)

Area
  - Municipality and town: 199.5 km^{2} (77.0 sq mi)
- Elevation: 1,680.3 m (5,513 ft)

Population (2015)
  - Municipality and town: 4,821
  - Density: 24.17/km^{2} (62.59/sq mi)
  - Urban: 1,108
- Time zone: UTC-5 (Colombia Standard Time)
- Website: Official website

Macanal is a town and municipality in the Colombian Department of Boyacá, part of the subregion of the Neira Province. The urban centre is located in the Tenza Valley in the Eastern Ranges of the Colombian Andes at an elevation of 1,680.3 metres (5,513 ft) but parts of the municipality reach elevations of 2,500 metres (8,200 ft). It borders Campohermoso in the east, Almeida in the west, Garagoa in the north and Santa María and Chivor in the south.

== Etymology ==
The name Macanal is either derived from the Chibcha word Macana, meaning garrote, or from the Macana palm tree (Wettinia kalbreyeri).

== History ==
The area of Macanal was part of the Muisca Confederation, a loose confederation of different rulers of the Muisca. The zaque of Hunza ruled over Macanal.

Modern Macanal was founded on May 4, 1807.

== Geology ==
The Macanal Formation, an organic shale, outcrops near and has been named after Macanal.

== Economy ==
Main economical activities of Macanal are agriculture; coffee (Coffea arabica), bananas, maize, beans (Phaseolus vulgaris), yuca, sugarcane (Saccharum officinarum), arracacha (Arracacia xanthorrhiza), avocadoes, papayas, mangoes, guayaba and cucumbers (Cucumis sativus and Cyclanthera pedata), livestock farming and mining (gypsum and emeralds).

== Climate ==
Climate data for Macanal (Inst Agr Macanal), elevation 1,300 m (4,300 ft), (1981–2010)
Month	Jan	Feb	Mar	Apr	May	Jun	Jul	Aug	Sep	Oct	Nov	Dec	Year
Mean daily maximum °C (°F)	23.5 (74.3)	24.1 (75.4)	23.5 (74.3)	22.6 (72.7)	21.9 (71.4)	21.0 (69.8)	20.5 (68.9)	21.1 (70.0)	22.1 (71.8)	22.7 (72.9)	22.3 (72.1)	22.7 (72.9)	22.2 (72.0)
Daily mean °C (°F)	17.5 (63.5)	17.8 (64.0)	17.9 (64.2)	17.7 (63.9)	17.3 (63.1)	16.6 (61.9)	16.2 (61.2)	16.4 (61.5)	16.9 (62.4)	17.4 (63.3)	17.6 (63.7)	17.4 (63.3)	17.2 (63.0)
Mean daily minimum °C (°F)	12.9 (55.2)	13.4 (56.1)	14.1 (57.4)	14.6 (58.3)	14.4 (57.9)	13.9 (57.0)	13.3 (55.9)	13.3 (55.9)	13.3 (55.9)	13.6 (56.5)	14.1 (57.4)	13.5 (56.3)	13.7 (56.7)
Average precipitation mm (inches)	26.6 (1.05)	64.2 (2.53)	101.5 (4.00)	191.5 (7.54)	322.9 (12.71)	367.9 (14.48)	353.7 (13.93)	293.6 (11.56)	204.8 (8.06)	160.4 (6.31)	104.5 (4.11)	48.5 (1.91)	2,206.3 (86.86)
Average precipitation days (≥ 1.0 mm)	9	11	16	24	27	28	29	28	24	22	20	14	246
Average relative humidity (%)	84	83	85	88	90	91	92	90	88	88	88	87	88
Mean monthly sunshine hours	182.9	144.0	120.9	96.0	96.1	81.0	86.8	93.0	120.0	142.6	144.0	173.6	1,480.9
Mean daily sunshine hours	5.9	5.1	3.9	3.2	3.1	2.7	2.8	3.0	4.0	4.6	4.8	5.6	4.1
Source: Instituto de Hidrologia Meteorologia y Estudios Ambientales

== Gallery ==
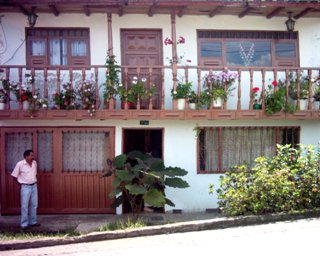
House in Macanal

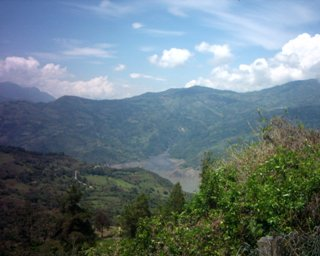
Landscape around Macanal

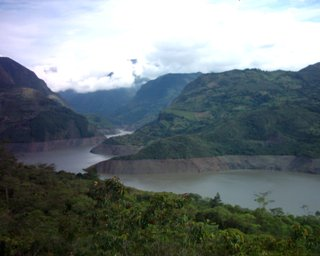
Artificial lake near Macanal
