= Guateque =

Guateque Guatoc
- Municipality and town
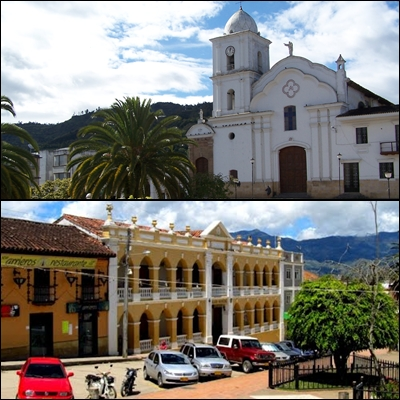
- Church and colonial building in Guateque

- Flag

- Location of the town and municipality of Guateque in Boyaca Department

- Location in Colombia
- Coordinates: 5°0′20″N 73°28′20″W
- Country: Colombia
- Department: Boyacá Department
- Province: Eastern Boyacá Province
- Founded: 28 January 1636
- Founder: Diego Morales et al.

Government
  - Mayor: Iván Camilo Camero Alfonso (2020-2023)

Area
  - Municipality and town: 36.04 km^{2} (13.92 sq mi)
  - Urban: 1.82 km^{2} (0.70 sq mi)
- Elevation: 1,815 m (5,955 ft)

Population (2015)
  - Municipality and town: 9,603
  - Density: 266.5/km^{2} (690.1/sq mi)
  - Urban: 7,176
- Time zone: UTC-5
- Website: Official website

Guateque is a town and municipality in the Colombian Department of Boyacá, part of the subregion of the Eastern Boyacá Province. Guateque's urban center is located at an altitude of 1,815 metres (5,955 ft) on the Altiplano Cundiboyacense at distances of 125 kilometres (78 mi) from the department capital Tunja and 112 kilometres (70 mi) from Bogotá, capital of Colombia. It borders the municipalities of La Capilla, Tenza, Sutatenza, Somondoco of Boyacá and Tibiritá and Manta of Cundinamarca.

== Etymology ==
Guateque is derived from the original name Guatoc, meaning "Stream of the ravine" or "Lord of the winds".

== History ==
In the centuries before the Spanish conquest of the Muisca, the central highlands of Colombia were inhabited by the Muisca. The Muisca practiced different rituals related to their religion. On the hill within the municipality that they called Guatoc, the people organized religious festivities. The cacique of Guateque was an important leader within the loose Muisca Confederation, as gold mining was executed in Guateque.

While Catholic missionaries were already working in Guateque since 1556, the modern town was founded on January 28, 1636, by a group of Spanish leaders.

== Economy ==
Despite the urban character of Guateque, almost half of its economy is based on agriculture and livestock farming. Predominant agricultural products are maize and tomatoes.

== Born in Guateque ==
- Víctor Carranza, "the czar of emeralds"
- Francisco Estupiñán Heredia, politician
- Enrique Olaya Herrera, president of Colombia

== Climate ==
Climate data for Guateque/Sutatenza, elevation 1,930 m (6,330 ft), (1981–2010)
| Month | Jan | Feb | Mar | Apr | May | Jun | Jul | Aug | Sep | Oct | Nov | Dec | Year |
|---|---|---|---|---|---|---|---|---|---|---|---|---|---|
| Mean daily maximum °C (°F) | 24.3 (75.7) | 24.4 (75.9) | 24.1 (75.4) | 23.3 (73.9) | 22.5 (72.5) | 21.4 (70.5) | 20.9 (69.6) | 21.4 (70.5) | 22.7 (72.9) | 23.4 (74.1) | 23.6 (74.5) | 23.9 (75.0) | 23.0 (73.4) |
| Daily mean °C (°F) | 18.2 (64.8) | 18.3 (64.9) | 18.4 (65.1) | 18.2 (64.8) | 17.9 (64.2) | 17.2 (63.0) | 16.9 (62.4) | 17.0 (62.6) | 17.6 (63.7) | 18.0 (64.4) | 18.2 (64.8) | 18.3 (64.9) | 17.8 (64.0) |
| Mean daily minimum °C (°F) | 13.3 (55.9) | 13.8 (56.8) | 14.5 (58.1) | 14.6 (58.3) | 14.4 (57.9) | 13.8 (56.8) | 13.3 (55.9) | 13.5 (56.3) | 13.3 (55.9) | 13.8 (56.8) | 14.1 (57.4) | 13.6 (56.5) | 13.8 (56.8) |
| Average precipitation mm (inches) | 18.9 (0.74) | 31.3 (1.23) | 53.5 (2.11) | 119.3 (4.70) | 177.2 (6.98) | 184.5 (7.26) | 171.9 (6.77) | 148.2 (5.83) | 107.0 (4.21) | 98.3 (3.87) | 68.7 (2.70) | 24.8 (0.98) | 1,203.5 (47.38) |
| Average precipitation days | 6 | 8 | 13 | 18 | 23 | 25 | 25 | 23 | 18 | 17 | 15 | 9 | 200 |
| Average relative humidity (%) | 76 | 76 | 77 | 79 | 81 | 82 | 83 | 82 | 80 | 78 | 78 | 77 | 79 |
| Mean monthly sunshine hours | 201.5 | 163.7 | 133.3 | 111.0 | 108.5 | 87.0 | 96.1 | 105.4 | 129.0 | 142.6 | 153.0 | 186.0 | 1,617.1 |
| Mean daily sunshine hours | 6.5 | 5.8 | 4.3 | 3.7 | 3.5 | 2.9 | 3.1 | 3.4 | 4.3 | 4.6 | 5.1 | 6.0 | 4.4 |
Source: Instituto de Hidrologia Meteorologia y Estudios Ambientales

== Gallery ==
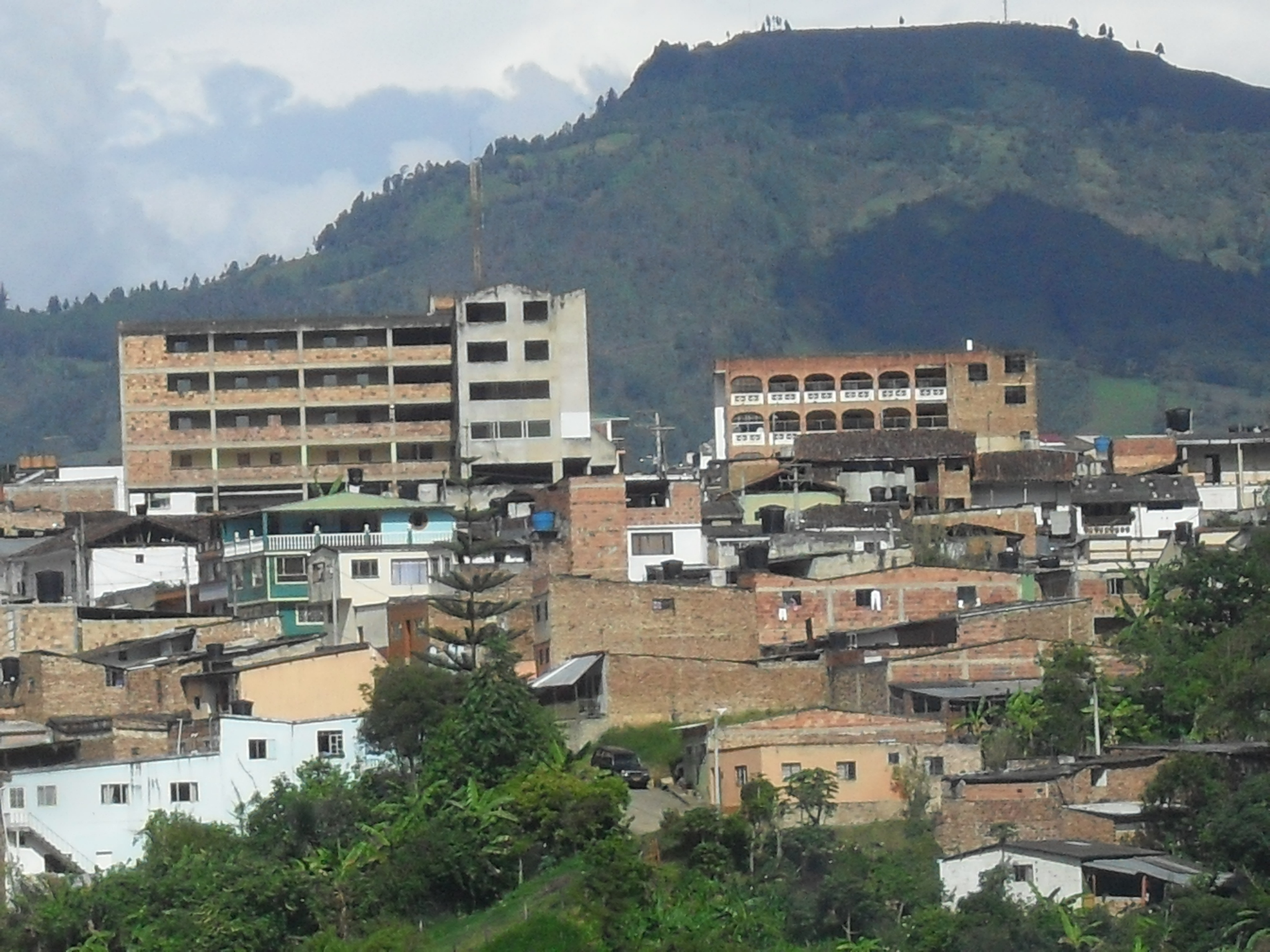
View of Guateque

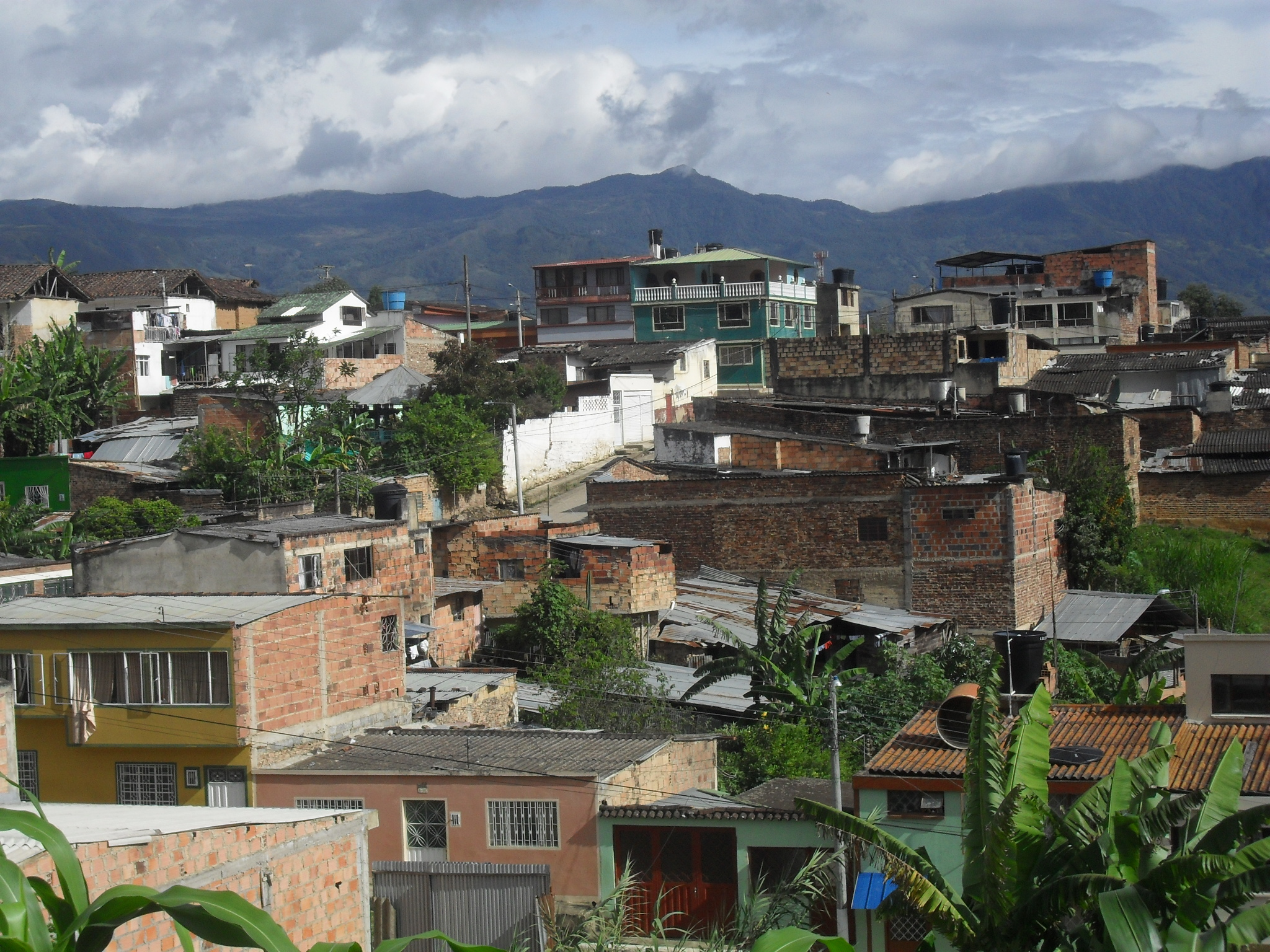
View of Guateque

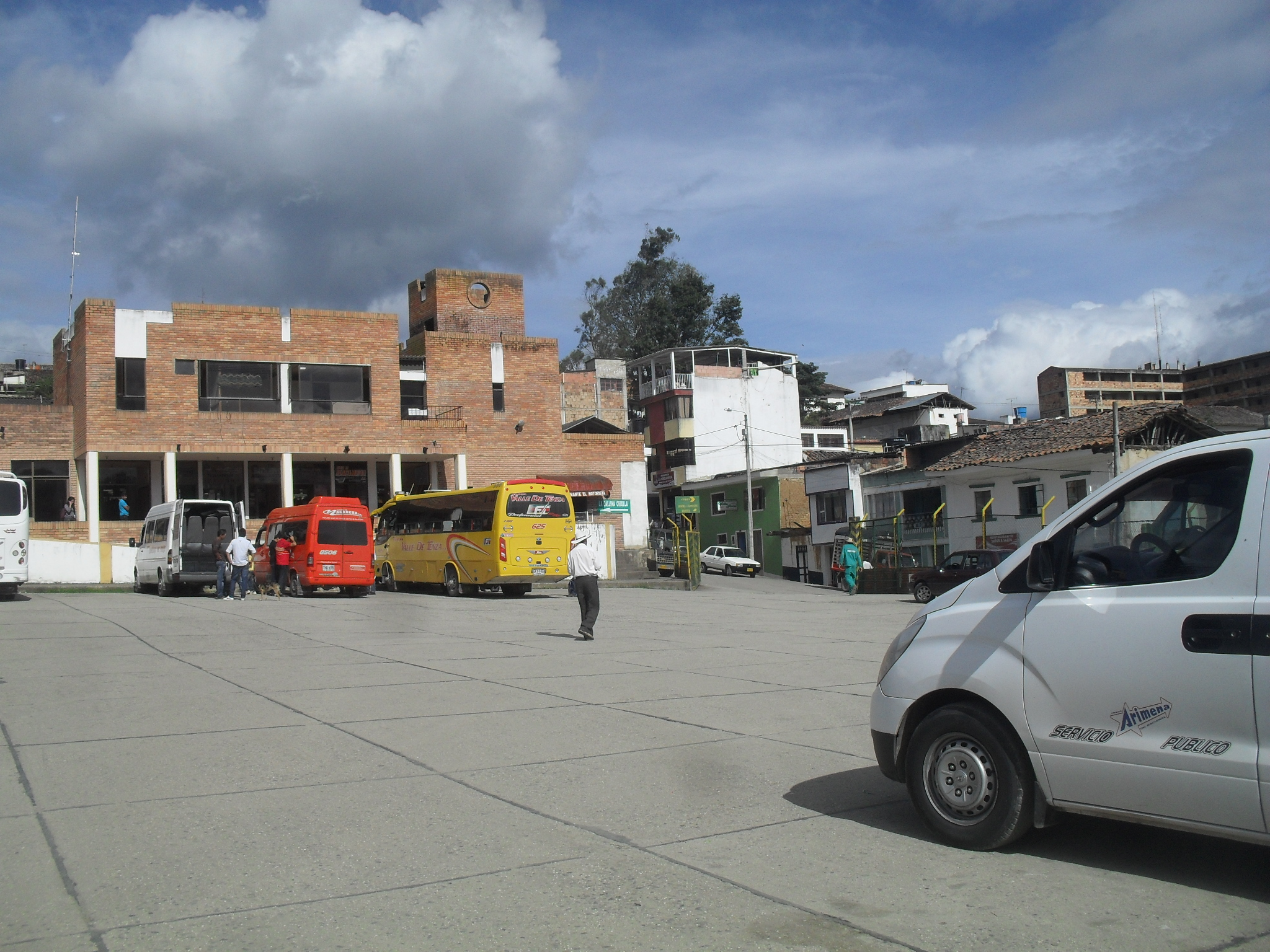
Bus terminal

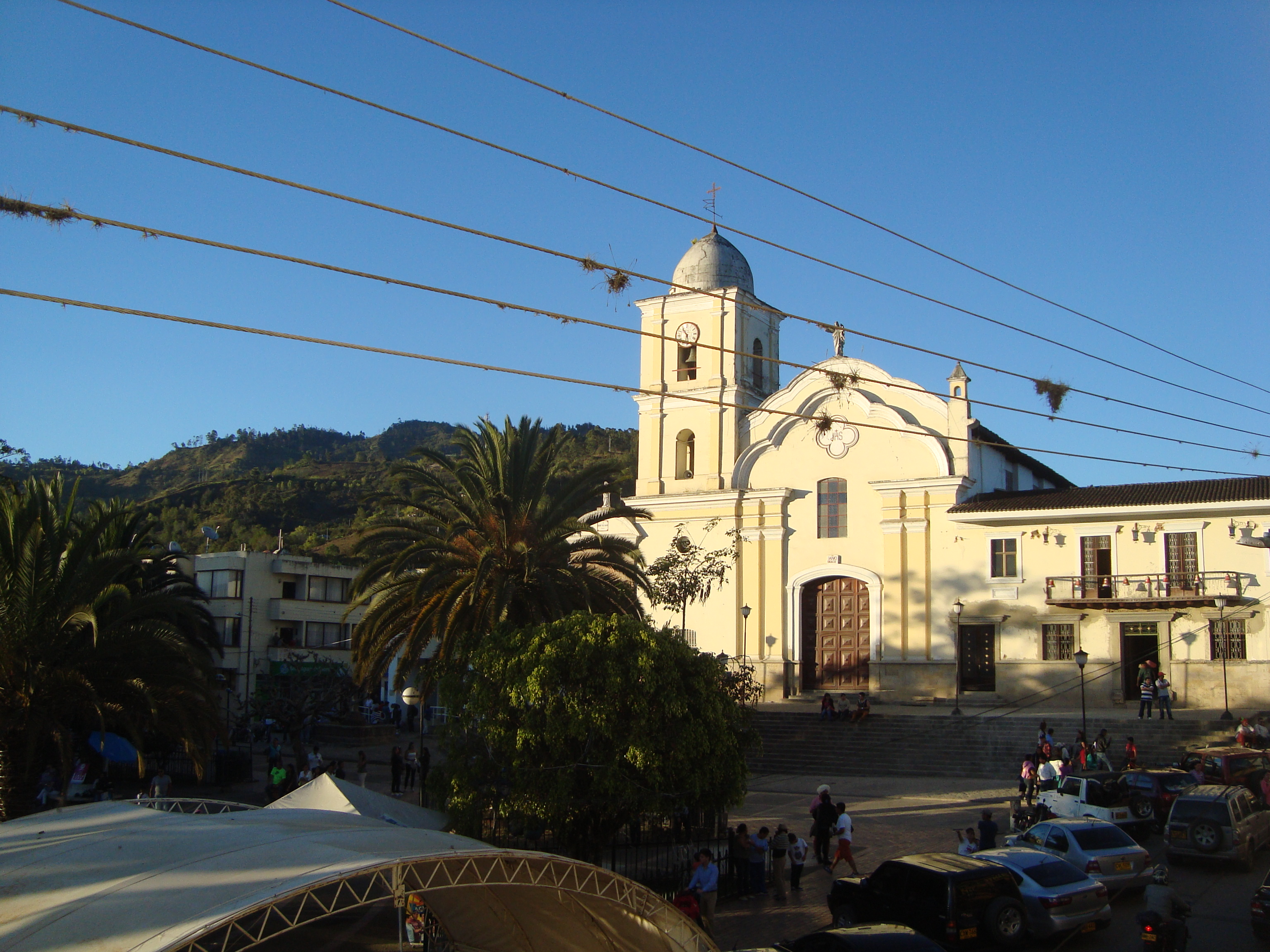
View of Guateque Main Church
