= Tenza =

Coordinates: 5°05′N 73°25′W

- Municipality and town
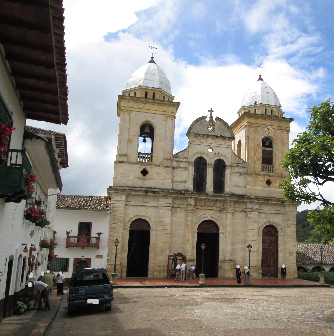
- Church of Tenza

- Flag

- Location of the municipality and town of Tenza in the Boyacá Department of Colombia
- Country: Colombia
- Department: Boyacá Department
- Province: Eastern Boyacá Province
- Founded: 24 June 1537
- Founder: Pedro Fernández de Valenzuela

Government
  - Mayor: Jose Luis Gómez Alfonso (2020-2023)

Area
  - Municipality and town: 51 km^{2} (20 sq mi)
- Elevation: 1,600 m (5,200 ft)

Population (2015)
  - Municipality and town: 4,112
  - Density: 81/km^{2} (210/sq mi)
  - Urban: 1,229
- Time zone: UTC-5 (Colombia Standard Time)
- Website: Official website

Tenza (Spanish pronunciation: [ˈtensa]) is a town and municipality in the subregion of the Eastern Boyacá Province of the Colombian department Boyacá. Tenza borders La Capilla and Pachavita in the north, in the east the department of Cundinamarca, in the south with Sutatenza and in the east with Garagoa. The altitude of the municipality in the Tenza Valley ranges from 1,600 metres (5,200 ft) to 2,200 metres (7,200 ft).

== History ==
Tenza used to be inhabited by the Muisca before the arrival of the Spanish conquistadores led by Gonzalo Jiménez de Quesada who was looking for emeralds. The village was ruled by the cacique of Cora, loyal to the zaque of Hunza. Modern Tenza was founded during the Spanish conquest of the Muisca by the Jiménez de Quesada, on June 24, Saint John's day, 1537.

Tenza used to be called Tenazuca, which in the Chibcha language of the Muisca means "going down at night".

== Economy ==
Livestock farming is the most important activity. The agriculture of Tenza is relatively modest with beans, peas, maize, yuca, arracacha, tomatoes, cucumbers and bananas. Some mining is executed in Tenza.

== Born in Tenza ==
- Juan Morales, former professional cyclist
