= Somondoco =

Coordinates: 4.98778°N 73.4361°W

- Municipality and town
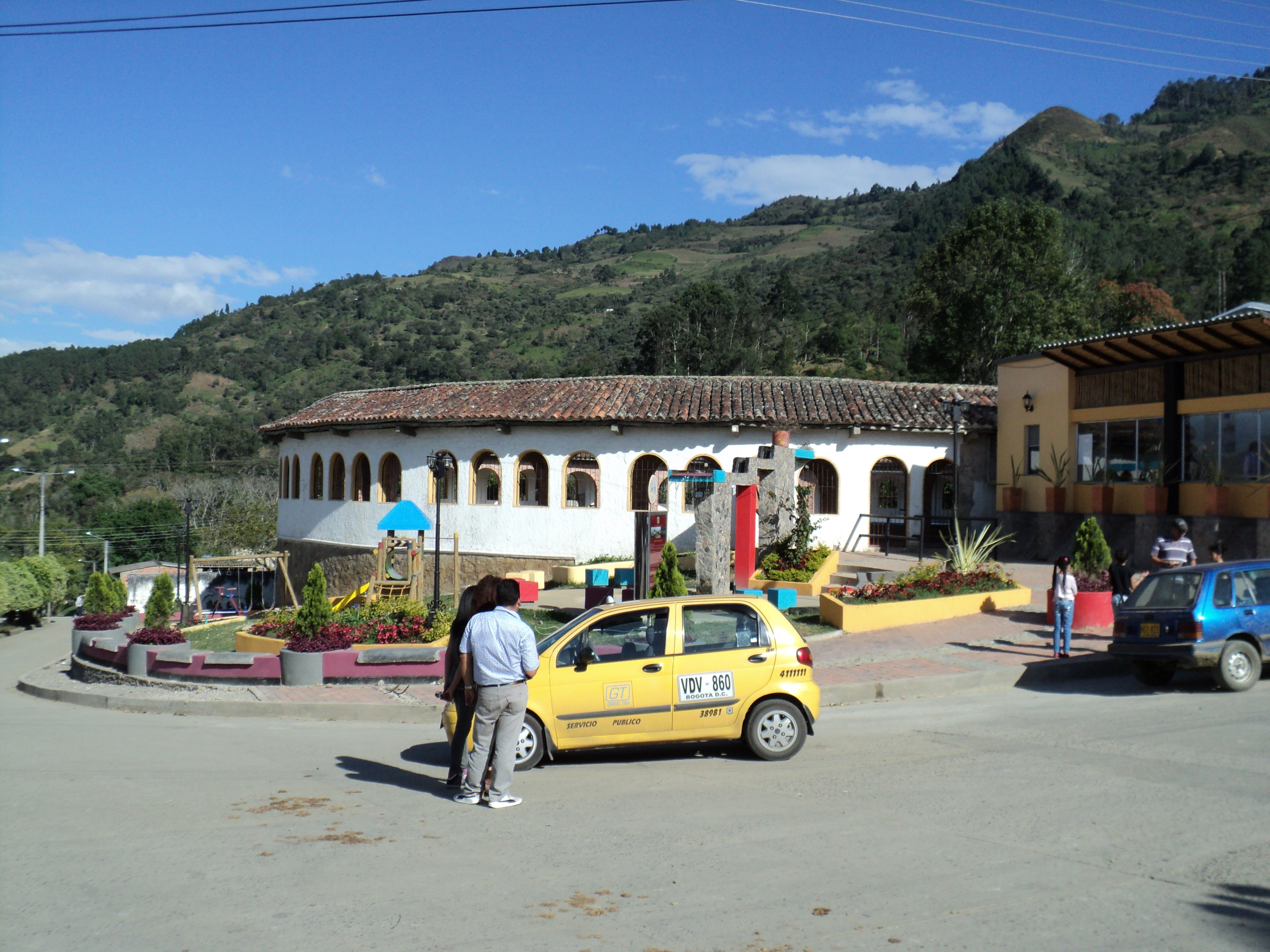
- Bull fighting arena Somondoco

- Flag

- Location of the municipality and town of Somondoco in the Boyacá Department of Colombia
- Country: Colombia
- Department: Boyacá Department
- Province: Eastern Boyacá Province
- Founded: 6 November 1537

Government
  - Mayor: Edison Rolando Gaitán Roa (2020-2023)

Area
  - Municipality and town: 58.7 km^{2} (22.7 sq mi)
  - Urban: 2.4 km^{2} (0.93 sq mi)
- Elevation: 1,670 m (5,480 ft)

Population (2015)
  - Municipality and town: 3,632
  - Density: 61.9/km^{2} (160/sq mi)
  - Urban: 795
- Time zone: UTC-5 (Colombia Standard Time)
- Website: Official website

Somondoco is a town and municipality in the Colombian Department of Boyacá. This town and larger municipal area are located in the Valle de Tenza. The Valle de Tenza is the ancient route connecting the Altiplano Cundiboyacense and the Llanos. The area is dotted with many such little towns all located at approximately the same altitude (1500–1700 meters). Somondoco borders Almeida in the east, Guayatá in the west, Guateque and Sutatenza in the north and the Cundinamarca municipality of Ubalá in the south.

The nearest larger town is Guateque which is about 30 minutes away by car. Several small companies in Somondoco produce handicrafts and collectables.

== Etymology ==
Somondoco is derived from the Chibcha words So = stone, Mon = bath, Co = support. The village is named after cacique Somendoco or Sumindoco.

== History ==
Somondoco is a very old center of population extending back into prehistory. The Muisca settled here due to the abundance of emeralds mined in the Andes mountains.

When the Spanish conquistadores led by Gonzalo Jiménez de Quesada arrived, Somondoco was ruled by a cacique named Sumindoco. He was loyal to the zaque of Hunza. The date of foundation of Somondoco is November 6, 1537.

== Economy ==
The main economical activities in Somondoco are emerald mining and agriculture; maize, tomatoes, sugar cane, beans, bananas and coffee are grown.

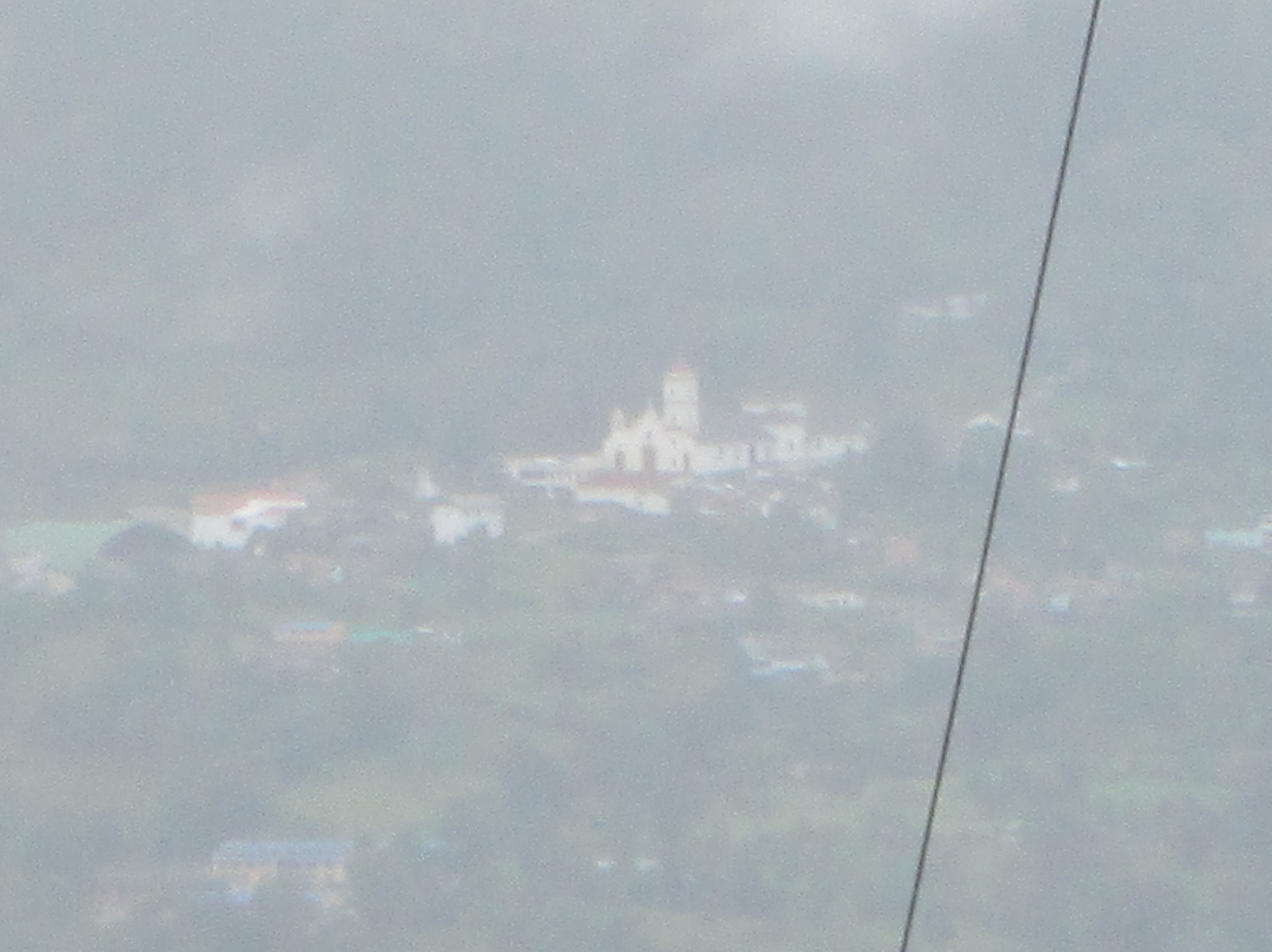
View of Somondoco
