= Chivor =

- Town and municipality
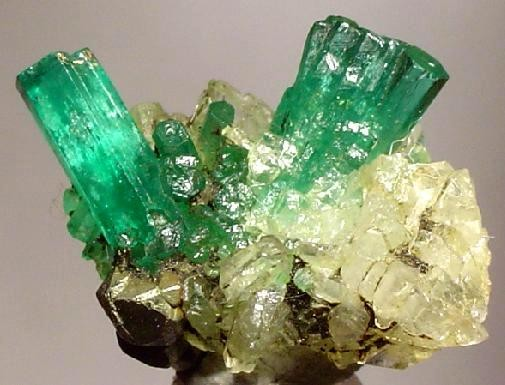
- Emeralds mined in Chivor

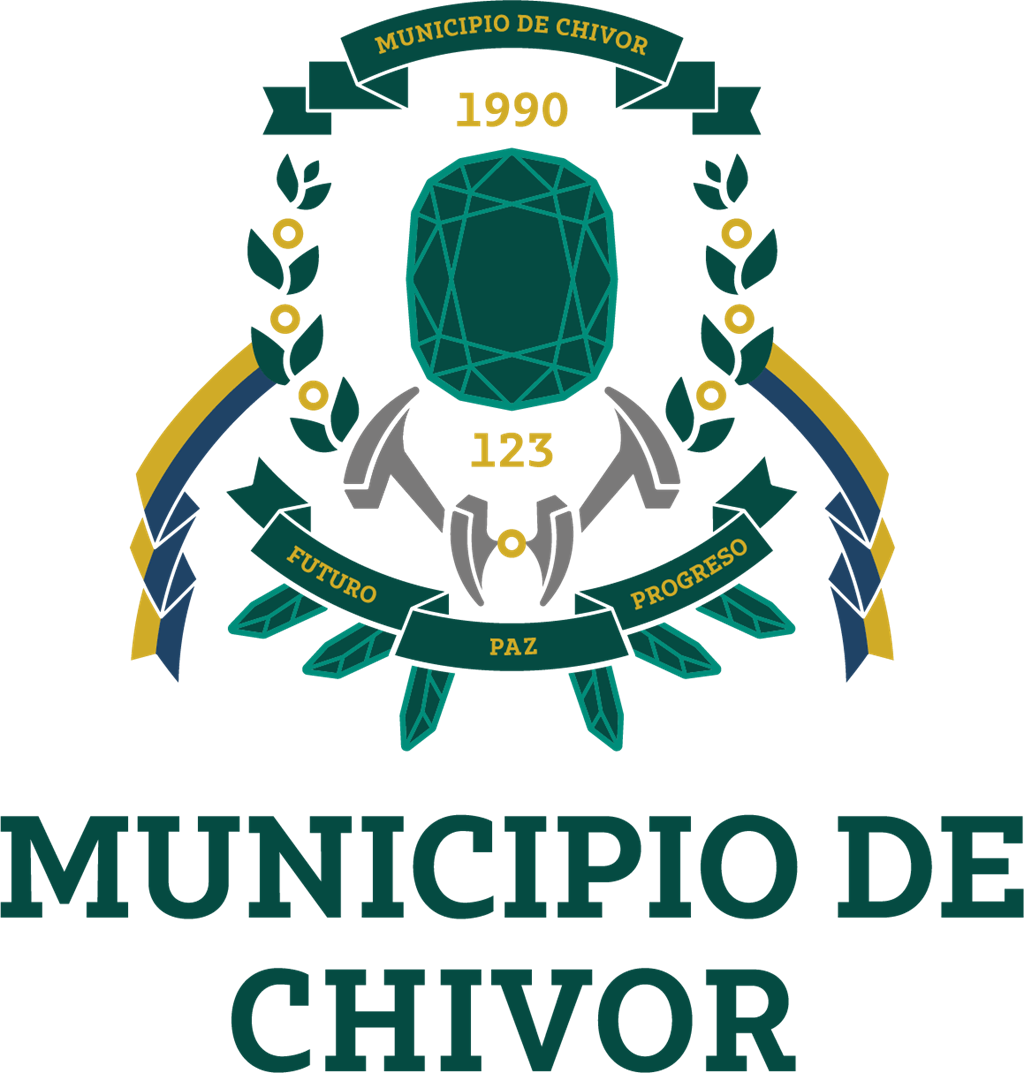
- Flag Coat of arms

- Location of the town and municipality of Chivor in Boyacá Department

- Location in Colombia
- Coordinates: 4°53′N 73°22′W
- Country: Colombia
- Department: Boyacá
- Province: Eastern Boyacá Province
- Founded: 16 December 1930
- Founder: Florencio Novoa

Government
  - Type: Municipality
  - Mayor: Didier Aurelio Martínez Vargas (2020-2023)

Area
  - Town and municipality: 108.36 km^{2} (41.84 sq mi)
  - Urban: 9.9 km^{2} (3.8 sq mi)
- Elevation: 1,800 m (5,900 ft)

Population (2015)
  - Town and municipality: 1,795
  - Density: 16.57/km^{2} (42.90/sq mi)
  - Urban: 486
- Website: Official website

Chivor is a town and municipality in the Eastern Boyacá Province, part of the Colombian department of Boyacá. The mean temperature of the village in the Tenza Valley is 18 °C (64 °F) and Chivor is located at 215 kilometres (134 mi) from the department capital Tunja. Economic activity includes emerald mining.

== Borders ==
It is bordered to the north by the municipality of Macanal; to the south by Ubalá, Cundinamarca, on the east by the municipality of Santa María, and the west by the municipality of Almeida.

== Etymology ==
Chivor comes from Chibcha and means "Our farmfields - our mother" or "Green and rich land". The latter refers to the rich emerald deposits.

== History ==
Chivor was inhabited by the Muisca in the times before the Spanish conquest. The Muisca were organized in their loose Muisca Confederation with northern ruler the zaque of Hunza and the southern zipa in Bacatá. Already in those times the rich emerald deposits were known and mined by the Muisca. The emeralds functioned as offer pieces in the Muisca religion, as decoration and as money.

The emerald deposits of Chivor were discovered by Spanish conquistador Gonzalo Jiménez de Quesada in 1537 but the mines were abandoned until 1886.

Modern Chivor was not founded until December 16, 1930, by Florencio Novoa.

== Economy ==
The main economic activities of Chivor are agriculture (maize, yuca, bananas, sugarcane, beans, chayote, coffee and fruits such as papayas, blackberries and the typical Colombian fruits lulo and tree tomatoes) and especially the emerald mining. In 2014 emeralds worth 30 million US dollars were extracted in Boyacá. The rich deposits have led to numerous conflicts in the region, including in Chivor.

The Gran Esmeralda de Moctezuma ("Great Emerald of Moctezuma") is a mineral of 21 centimetres (8.3 in) high, 17 centimetres (6.7 in) long and 16 centimetres (6.3 in) thick and has been found in Chivor. Currently the emerald is in Vienna, Austria. Other grand emeralds from Chivor are Patricia weighing 632 carats (126.4 grams (4.46 oz)), and La Magnífica of 1225 carats (245 grams (8.6 oz)).

The Embalse la Esmeralda ("Emerald reservoir") producing hydroelectric energy is governed from Chivor, Macanal and Almeida.

== Climate ==
Chivor has a subtropical highland climate (Cfb) with heavy to very heavy rainfall year-round.

Climate data for Chivor
Month	Jan	Feb	Mar	Apr	May	Jun	Jul	Aug	Sep	Oct	Nov	Dec	Year
Mean daily maximum °C (°F)	24.2 (75.6)	24.6 (76.3)	24.4 (75.9)	24.0 (75.2)	23.2 (73.8)	21.8 (71.2)	21.7 (71.1)	22.1 (71.8)	22.7 (72.9)	23.3 (73.9)	23.5 (74.3)	23.6 (74.5)	23.3 (73.9)
Daily mean °C (°F)	18.3 (64.9)	19.0 (66.2)	19.4 (66.9)	19.3 (66.7)	18.8 (65.8)	17.8 (64.0)	17.6 (63.7)	17.0 (62.6)	18.0 (64.4)	18.4 (65.1)	18.6 (65.5)	18.3 (64.9)	18.4 (65.1)
Mean daily minimum °C (°F)	12.5 (54.5)	13.4 (56.1)	14.5 (58.1)	14.6 (58.3)	14.5 (58.1)	13.9 (57.0)	13.6 (56.5)	13.7 (56.7)	13.4 (56.1)	13.6 (56.5)	13.7 (56.7)	13.1 (55.6)	13.7 (56.7)
Average rainfall mm (inches)	41.0 (1.61)	89.2 (3.51)	137.5 (5.41)	262.3 (10.33)	373.5 (14.70)	401.3 (15.80)	405.1 (15.95)	333.8 (13.14)	242.9 (9.56)	197.4 (7.77)	143.2 (5.64)	67.9 (2.67)	2,695.1 (106.09)
Average rainy days	9	12	17	24	27	28	28	27	23	23	20	13	251
Source 1: IDEAM
Source 2: Climate-Data.org

== Gallery ==
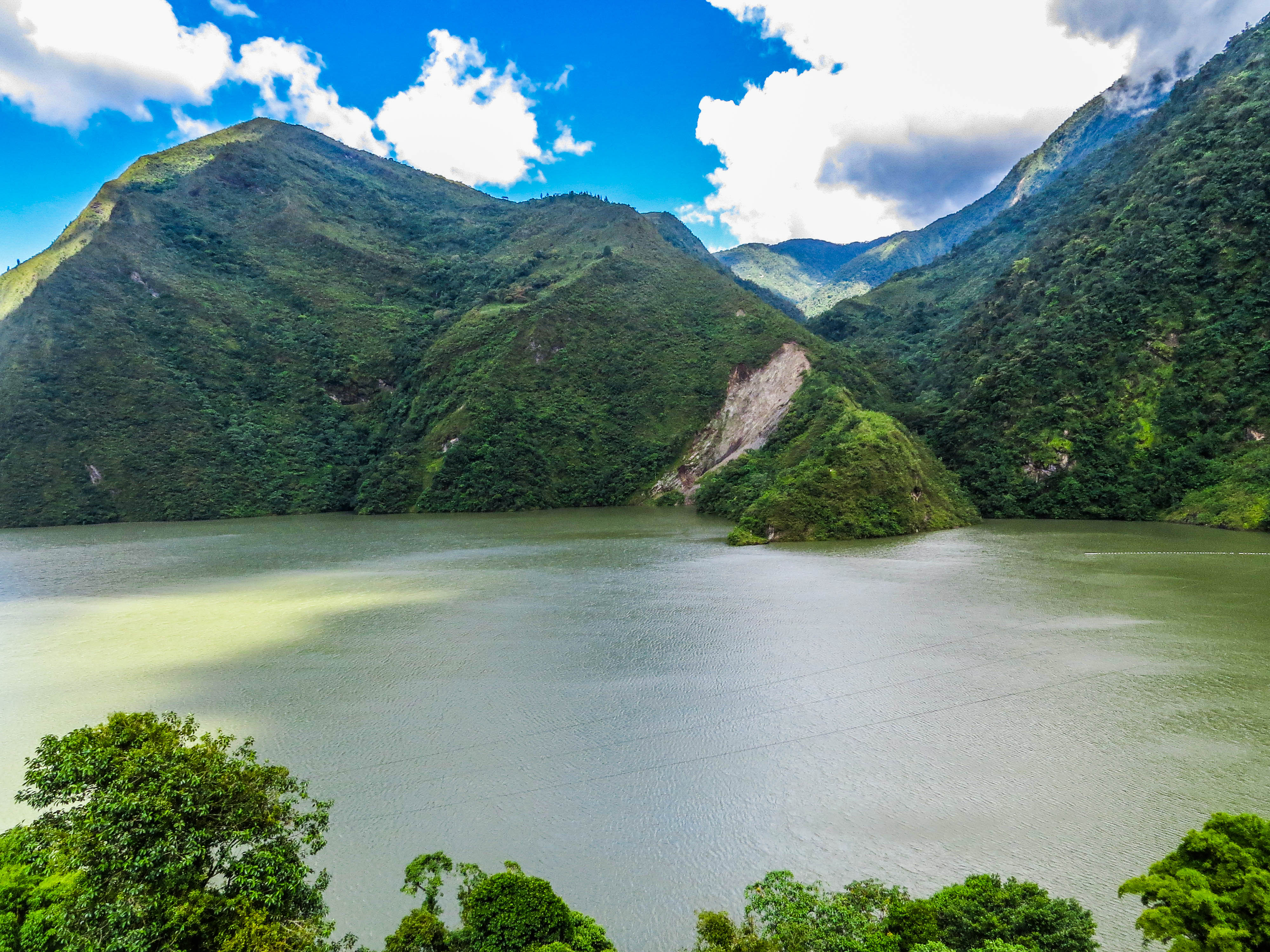
Emerald reservoir

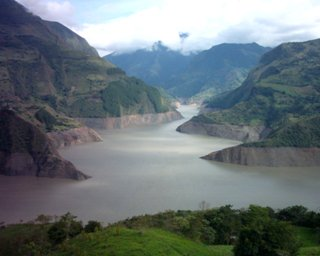
Reservoir

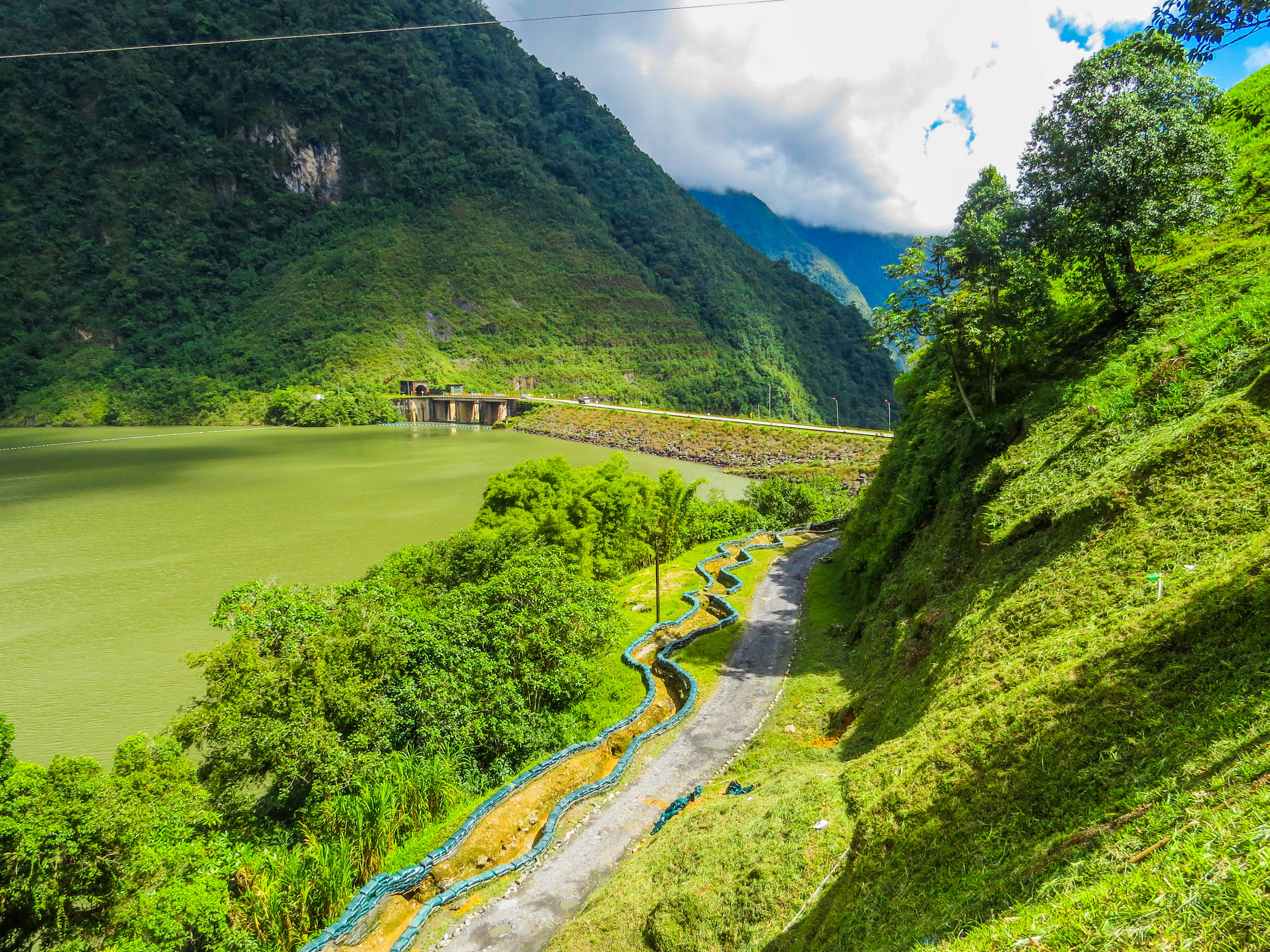
Reservoir

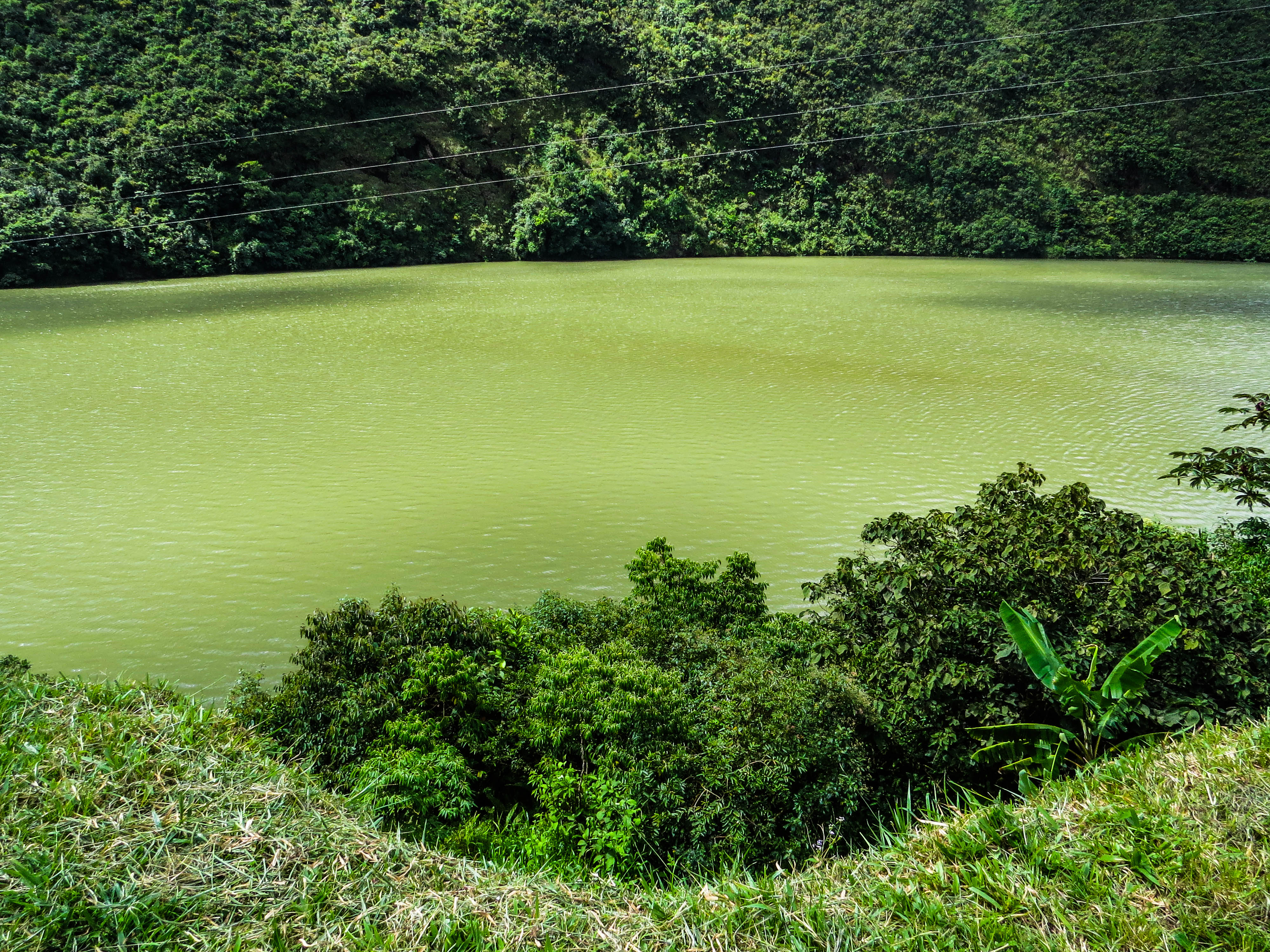
Reservoir
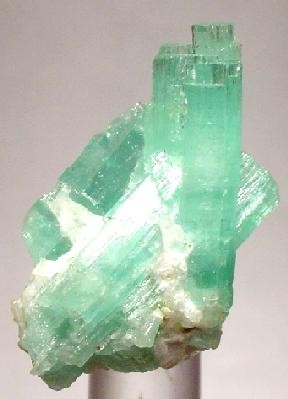
Emeralds from Chivor

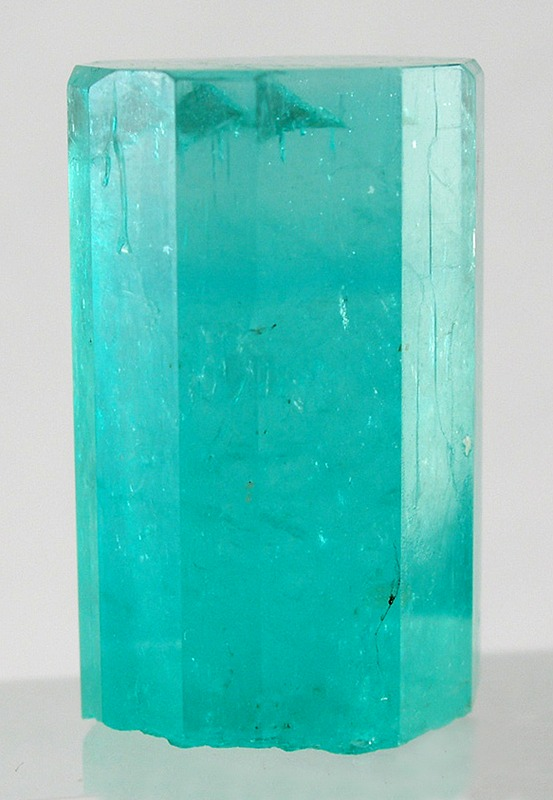
Emerald

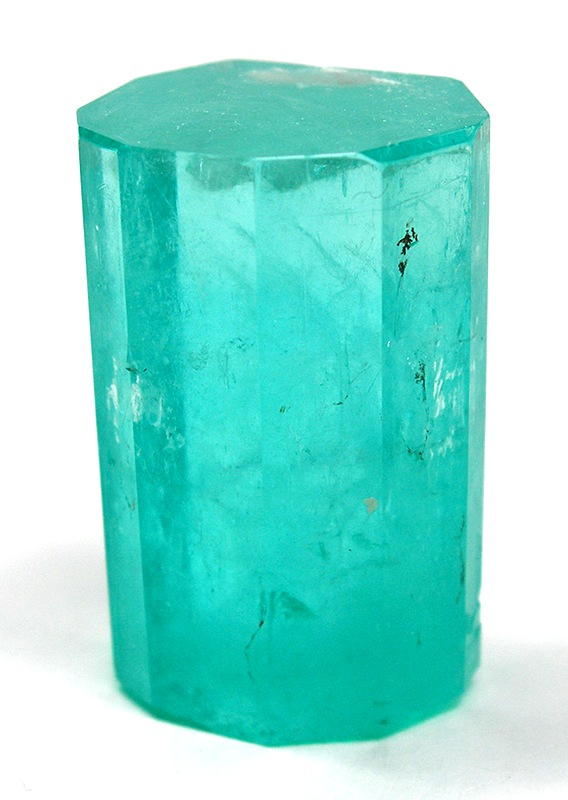
Emerald

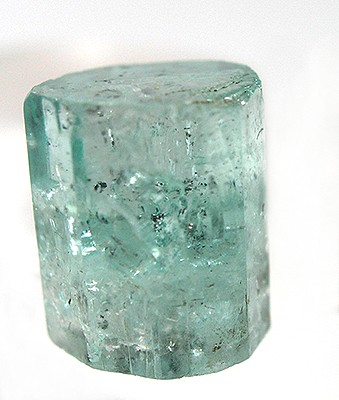
Emerald

== See also ==
- Muzo, another town in Boyacá famous for its emeralds
- Colombian emerald trade
- Colombian Emeralds
