= Almeida, Boyacá =

Coordinates: 4°58′N 73°23′W

- Municipality and town
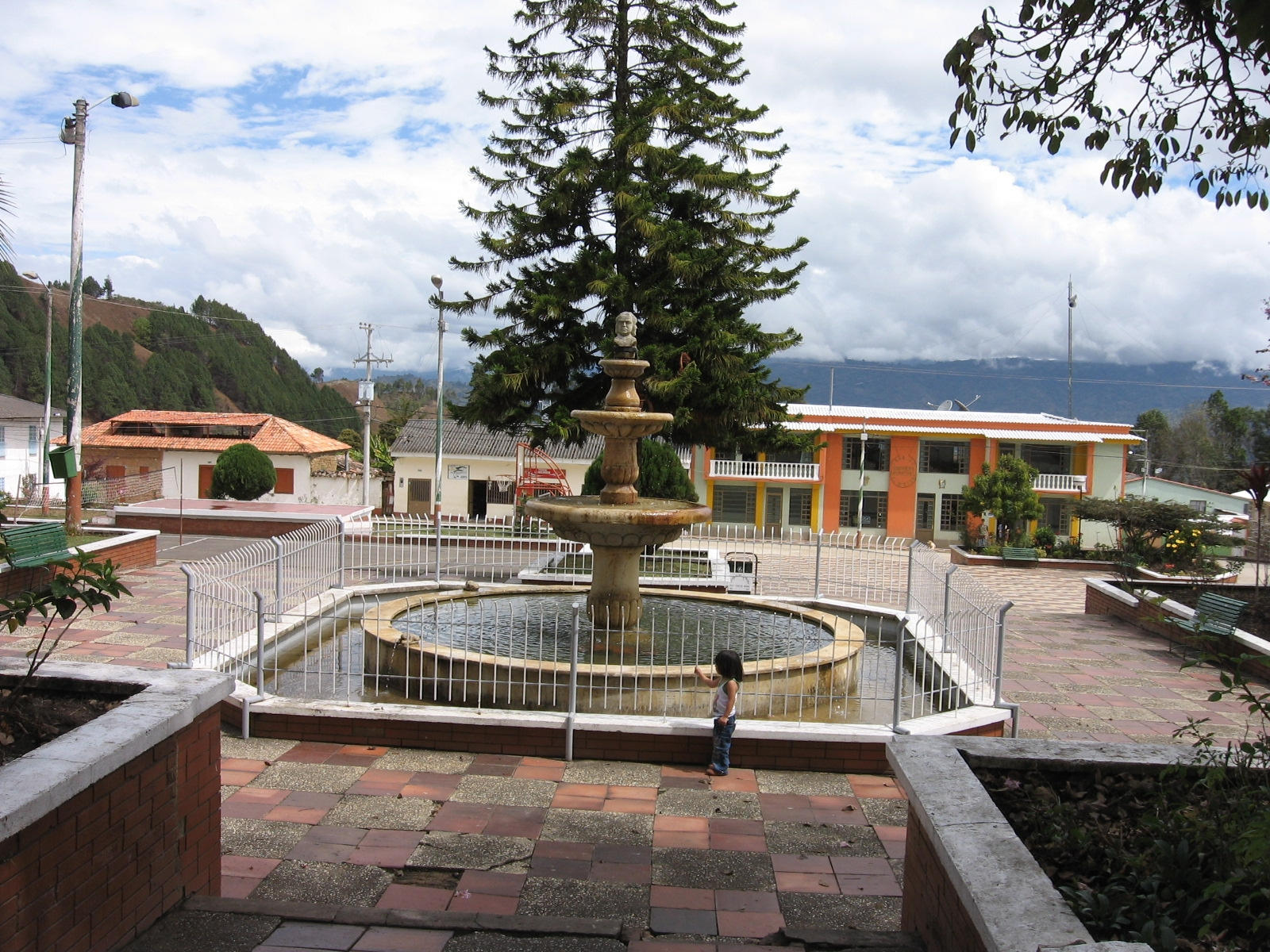

- Flag

- Location of the municipality and town of Almeida, Boyacá in the Boyacá Department of Colombia.
- Interactive map of Almeida, Boyacá
- Country: Colombia
- Department: Boyacá Department

Government
  - Mayor: Orlando Castañeda Montenegro (2020-2023)
- Time zone: UTC-5 (COT)

Almeida (Spanish pronunciation: [alˈmejða]) is a town and municipality in Boyacá Department, Colombia, part of the province of the Eastern Boyacá Province.

== Borders ==
- North with Garagoa municipality.
- West with: Somondoco municipality.
- South with: Guayatá and Chivor municipalities.
- East with: Macanal municipality

== Main Facts ==
- Market Day: Sunday
- Distance from Tunja: 125 km
- Elevation: 2200 m
- Extensión: 57 km²
- Median temperature: 19 °C
- Foundation: September 24 of 1907
- Demonym: Almeidunos
- Dane code: 15022
