= Sutatenza =

Coordinates: 5°01′N 73°27′W

- Municipality and town
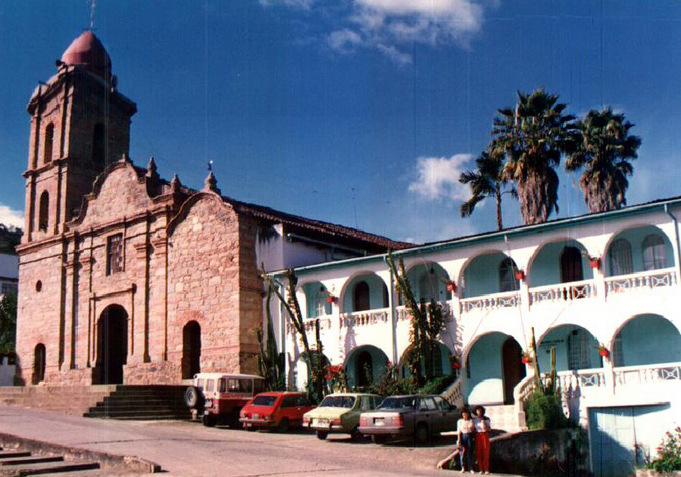
- Church of Sutatenza

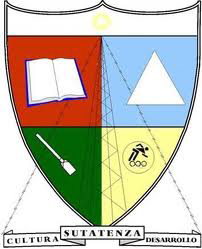
- Flag Coat of arms

- Location of the municipality and town of Sutatenza in the Boyacá Department of Colombia
- Country: Colombia
- Department: Boyacá Department
- Province: Eastern Boyacá Province
- Founded: 22 October 1783

Government
  - Mayor: Oscar Yovany Montenegro Salcedo (2020-2023)

Area
  - Municipality and town: 41.26 km^{2} (15.93 sq mi)
- Elevation: 1,890 m (6,200 ft)

Population (2015)
  - Municipality and town: 4,086
  - Density: 99.03/km^{2} (256.5/sq mi)
  - Urban: 769
- Time zone: UTC-5 (Colombia Standard Time)
- Website: Official website

Sutatenza (Spanish pronunciation: [sutaˈtensa]) is a town and municipality in the Eastern Boyacá Province of the department of Boyacá, Colombia. It is located 125 kilometres (78 mi) from the Colombian capital Bogotá and 118 kilometres (73 mi) from the department capital Tunja. Sutatenza borders Somondoco, Guateque, Tenza and Garagoa.

== Etymology ==
The name Sutatenza comes from Chibcha and means either "Cloud behind the anchovy" or "Descending to the house of the cacique".

== History ==
In the time before the Spanish conquest, Sutatenza, situated in the Tenza Valley to the east of the Altiplano Cundiboyacense, was ruled by a cacique called Tenzuzucá or Tenzucá, loyal to the zaque of Hunza. Conquistador Gonzalo Jiménez de Quesada in his quest for El Dorado and the rich emerald deposits of the Muisca Confederation visited Sutatenza in 1537.

Modern Sutatenza was not founded until October 22, 1783.

== Climate ==
Sutatenza has a subtropical highland climate (Köppen: Cfb) with mild temperatures and frequent rainfall. A dry season between December and February produces warmer and drier weather.

Climate data for Sutatenza, elevation 1,930 m (6,330 ft), (1981–2010)
Month	Jan	Feb	Mar	Apr	May	Jun	Jul	Aug	Sep	Oct	Nov	Dec	Year
Mean daily maximum °C (°F)	24.3 (75.7)	24.4 (75.9)	24.1 (75.4)	23.3 (73.9)	22.5 (72.5)	21.4 (70.5)	20.9 (69.6)	21.4 (70.5)	22.7 (72.9)	23.4 (74.1)	23.6 (74.5)	23.9 (75.0)	23.0 (73.4)
Daily mean °C (°F)	18.2 (64.8)	18.3 (64.9)	18.4 (65.1)	18.2 (64.8)	17.9 (64.2)	17.2 (63.0)	16.9 (62.4)	17.0 (62.6)	17.6 (63.7)	18.0 (64.4)	18.2 (64.8)	18.3 (64.9)	17.8 (64.0)
Mean daily minimum °C (°F)	13.3 (55.9)	13.8 (56.8)	14.5 (58.1)	14.6 (58.3)	14.4 (57.9)	13.8 (56.8)	13.3 (55.9)	13.5 (56.3)	13.3 (55.9)	13.8 (56.8)	14.1 (57.4)	13.6 (56.5)	13.8 (56.8)
Average precipitation mm (inches)	18.9 (0.74)	31.3 (1.23)	53.5 (2.11)	119.3 (4.70)	177.2 (6.98)	184.5 (7.26)	171.9 (6.77)	148.2 (5.83)	107.0 (4.21)	98.3 (3.87)	68.7 (2.70)	24.8 (0.98)	1,203.5 (47.38)
Average precipitation days	6	8	13	18	23	25	25	23	18	17	15	9	200
Average relative humidity (%)	76	76	77	79	81	82	83	82	80	78	78	77	79
Mean monthly sunshine hours	201.5	163.7	133.3	111.0	108.5	87.0	96.1	105.4	129.0	142.6	153.0	186.0	1,617.1
Mean daily sunshine hours	6.5	5.8	4.3	3.7	3.5	2.9	3.1	3.4	4.3	4.6	5.1	6.0	4.4
Source: Instituto de Hidrologia Meteorologia y Estudios Ambientales

== Economy ==
Main economical activities of Sutatenza are agriculture and aviculture. A small salt mine is operated in the vereda Salitre.

== Gallery ==
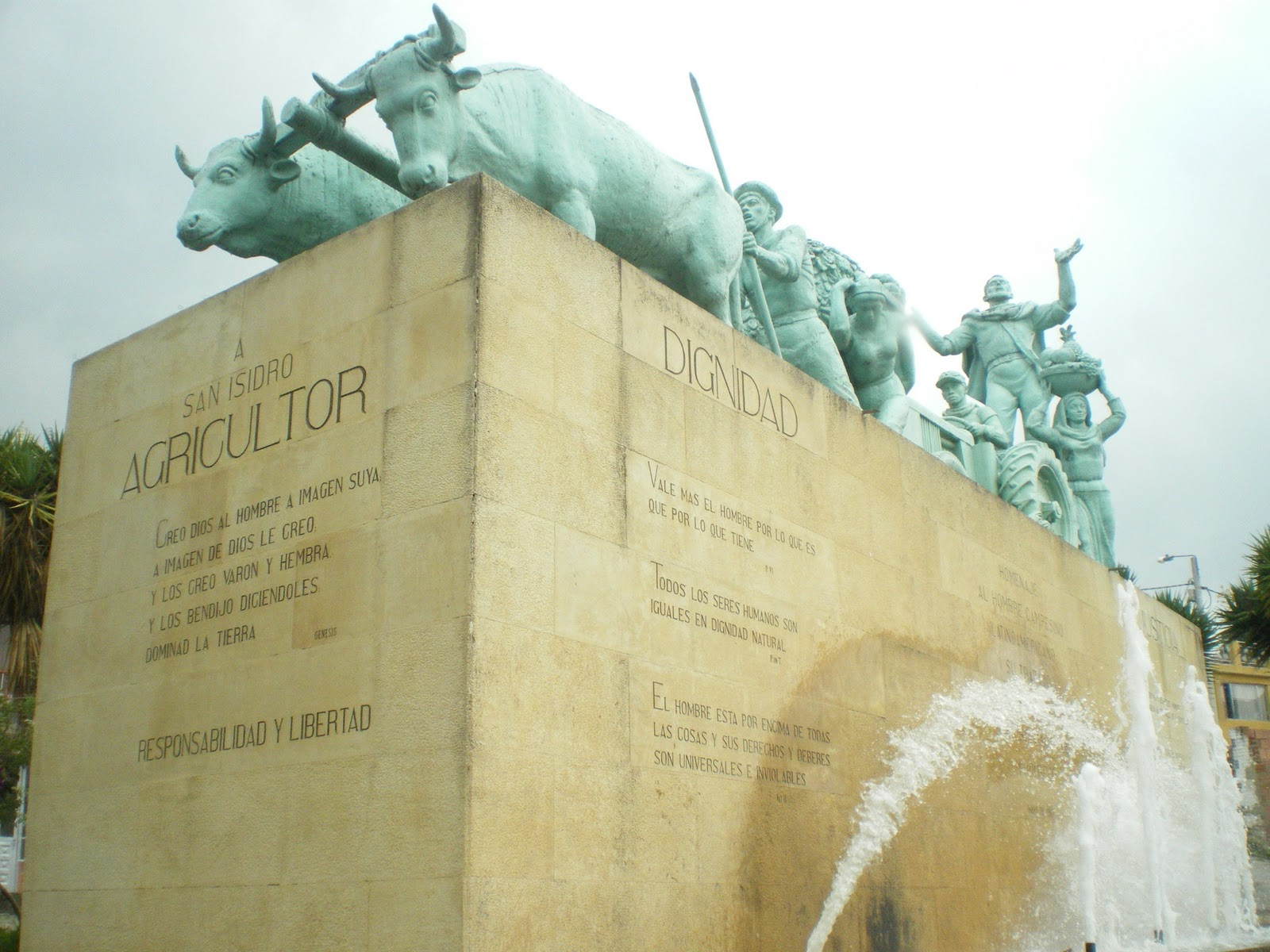
Monument to the farmers

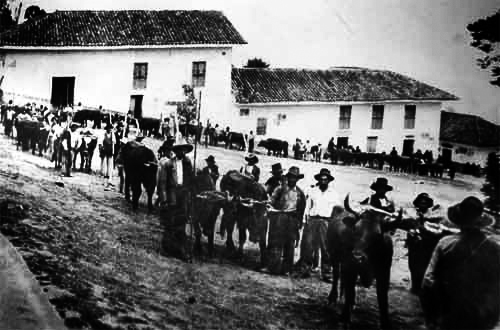
Ox market
