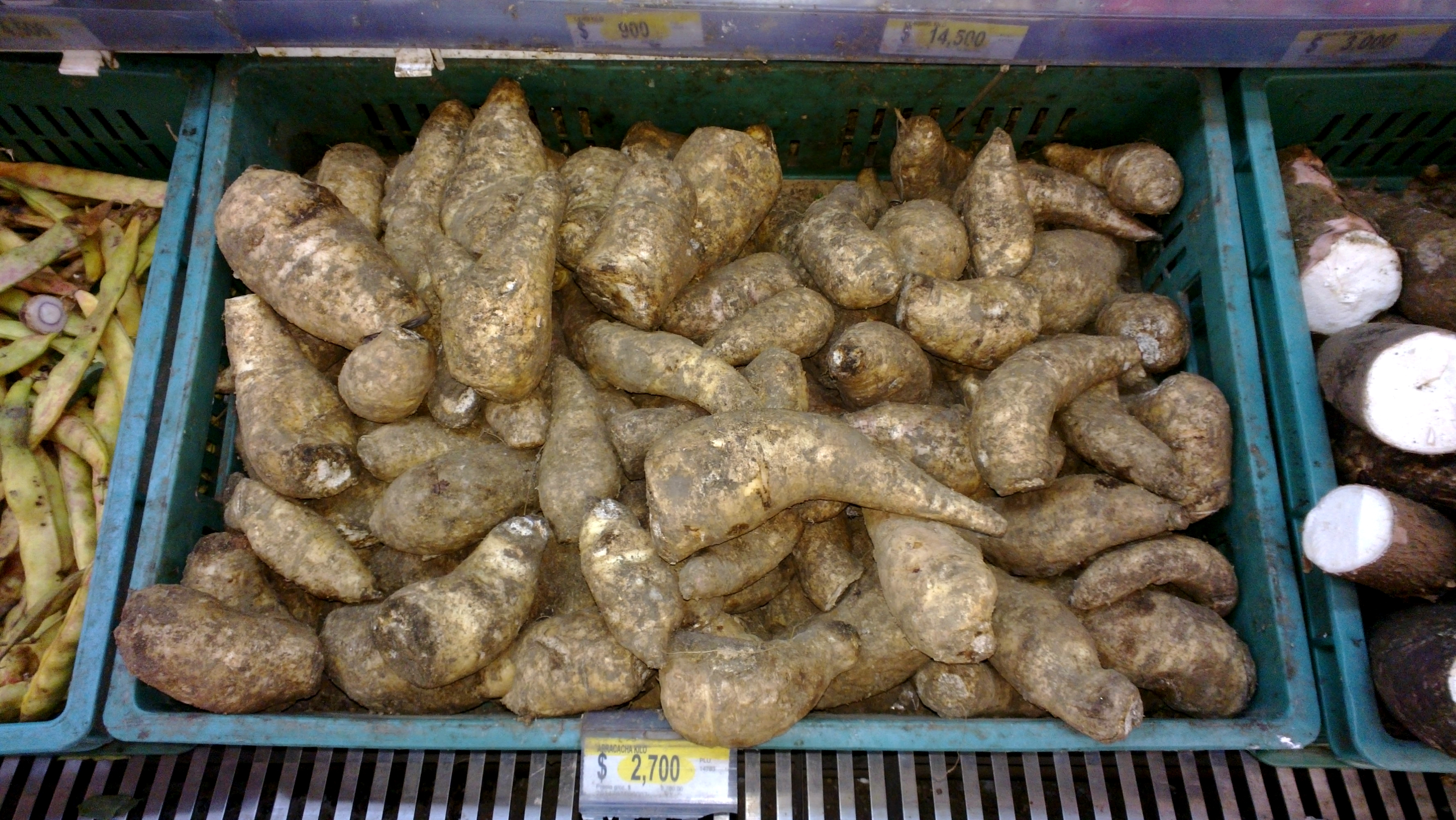
- Arracacha root for sale in a market

Scientific classification
- Kingdom: Plantae
- Clade: Embryophytes
- Clade: Tracheophytes
- Clade: Angiosperms
- Clade: Eudicots
- Clade: Asterids
- Order: Apiales
- Family: Apiaceae
- Genus: Arracacia
- Species: A. xanthorrhiza

Binomial name
- Arracacia xanthorrhiza Bancr.

Synonyms
- Arracacha esculenta DC.; Arracacia andina Britton; Arracacia esculenta DC.; Bancroftia decipiens R.K.Porter; Bancroftia xanthorrhiza Billb.; Conium arracacia Hook.

= Arracacia xanthorrhiza =

Root vegetable originally from the Andes

Arracacia xanthorrhiza is a root vegetable that originates in the Andes. Its starchy taproot is a major commercial crop and a popular food item across South America.

== Common names ==
Being a South American plant, its most common names are in either Spanish or Portuguese, the two most spoken languages in that continent.

The name arracacha (or racacha) was borrowed into Spanish from Quechua raqacha, and is used in the Andean region. The plant is also called apio or apio criollo ("Creole celery") in Venezuela, apio in Puerto Rico, zanahoria blanca ("white carrot") in Ecuador, and virraca in Peru.

Its Portuguese names are usually derived from the plant's similarity to other well known vegetables and roots. It is known as either mandioquinha ("little cassava") or batata-baroa ("baroness potato") in most regions of Brazil, but other common names in certain regions of that country include batata-salsa (“parsley potato”), batata fiúza ("trustworthy potato"), cenourinha-branca ("little white carrot"), and cenourinha-amarela or simply cenoura-amarela ("little yellow carrot" or simply "yellow carrot"), among others.

It is sometimes called Peruvian parsnip,white carrot or yellow cassava in English, but these names may also refer to other vegetables.

== Description and varieties ==
The leaves of arracacha are similar to parsley, and vary from dark green to purple. The roots resemble fat short carrots, with off-white skin. The interior may be white, yellow, or purple.

== Cultivation ==
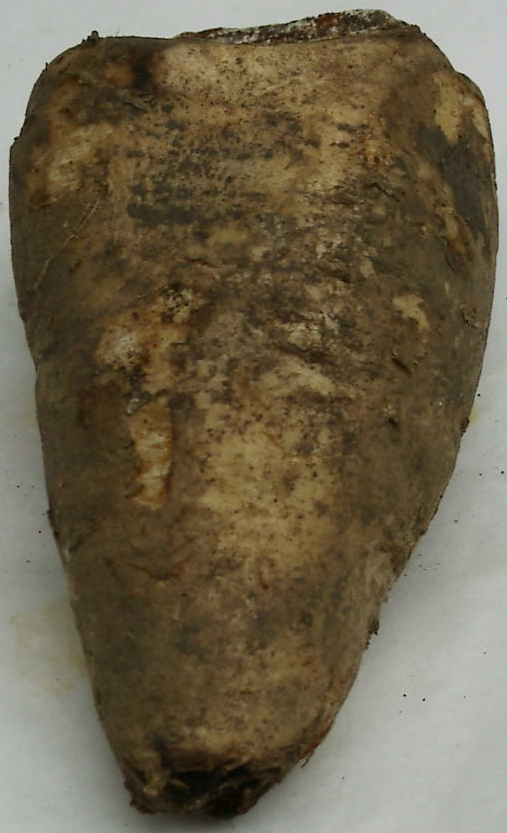
A freshly harvested arracacha root, still covered with dirt.

The plant is native to the region west of the Andes and grows at altitudes varying from 200 to 3,600 metres (650 to 11,800 ft) with an optimal altitude of between 1,800 and 2,500 m (5,900 and 8,200 ft). It is frequently grown with other crops such as maize, beans, and coffee. The plant is very susceptible to viruses and is slow to mature (10–12 months), but requires much less fertilizer input than the potato. Its harvest season in the Southern Hemisphere spans from January to September. Arracacia roots need to be picked promptly lest they become woody. They have a short shelf life and must reach consumers within a week of harvest. Fresh plants can be kept in the refrigerator for 2 to 3 weeks.

Arracacha cultivation can be very lucrative. It was imported into Brazil in the 19th century and has been grown commercially since the 1960s. Brazilian crop improvement programs have developed varieties that are ready to harvest in seven months.

== Uses ==
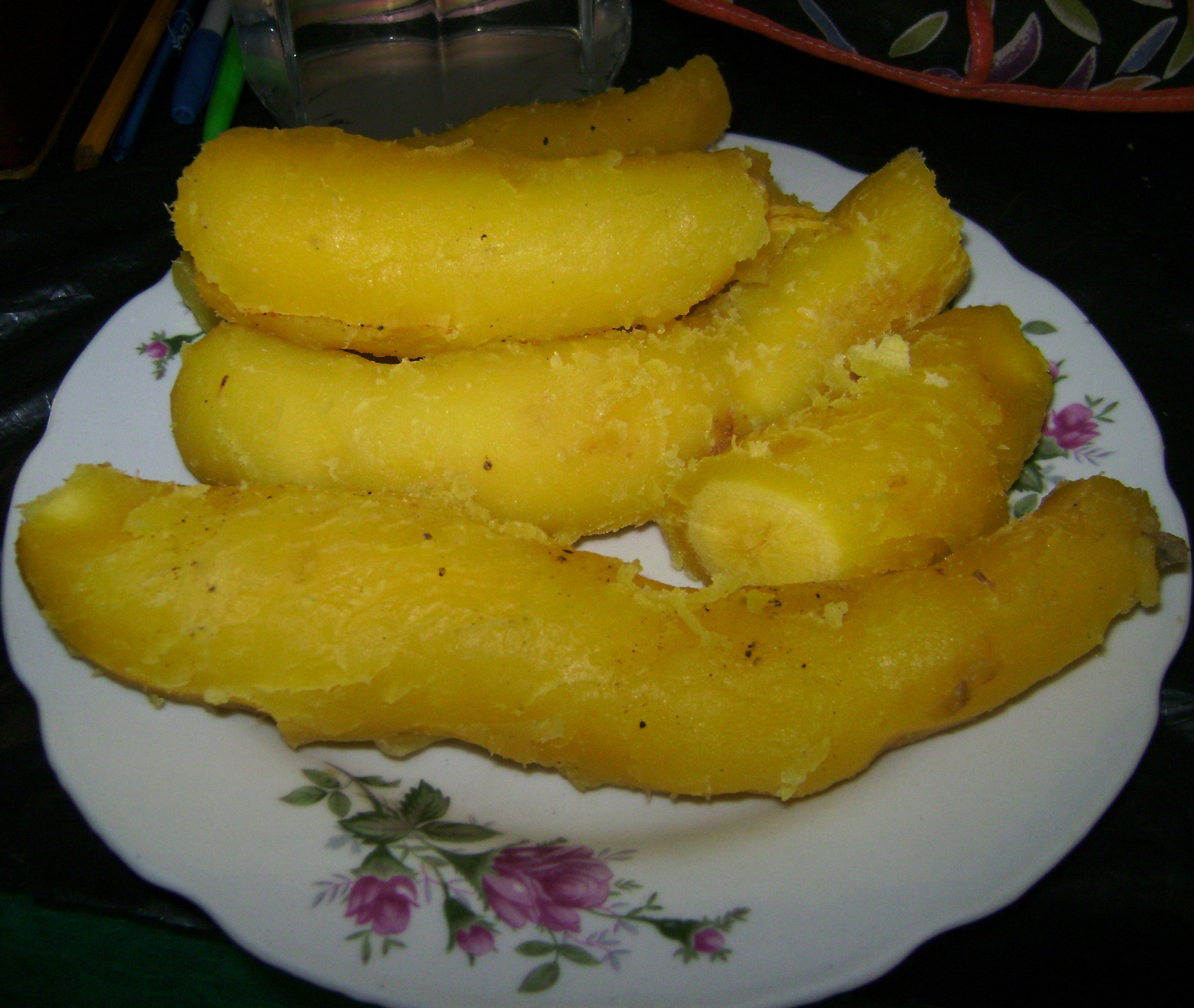
Arracacha, peeled, boiled, and served on a plate

The most widely used part of the plant is its starchy root. It cannot be eaten raw, but when cooked it develops a distinctive flavor and aroma that have been described as "a delicate blend of celery, cabbage and roasted chestnuts".

The boiled root is used in similar ways to boiled potatoes, including being served as side dishes, mashed or whipped into purées, formed into dumplings and gnocchi, as an ingredient in pastries, or creamed into soups, commonly garnished with chopped cilantro and croutons, though arracacia's flavor is stronger, and (depending on the variety) its color is more brilliant.

In the Andes region, Arracacia is made into fried chips, biscuits, and ground into a coarse flour. The small size of the starch grains make it highly digestible, so purées and soups made from it are considered excellent as food for babies and young children.

The young stems can be eaten cooked or in salads and the leaves can be fed to livestock.

=== Nutrition ===
100 grams of arracacha provide about 100 calories, 26g of which are dry matter, 23g being carbohydrate, and less than 1g of protein. The plant is rich in calcium, having four times as much as potatoes.

The yellow cultivar contains substantial amounts of carotenoid pigments, precursors to vitamin A, to the point that excessive consumption of arracachas may cause yellowing of the skin, a condition that is not considered to be harmful.
