= Alto Occidente Subregion =

Upper Western District Distrito Alto Occidente
- District
- Country: Colombia
- Department: Caldas
- Time zone: UTC−5 (COT)

The Upper Western District is a subregion of the Colombian Department of Caldas.

- Supía (Capital)
- Filadelfia
- La Merced
- Marmato
- Riosucio
