= Bajo Occidente Subregion =

Lower Western District Distrito Bajo Occidente
- District
- Country: Colombia
- Department: Caldas
- Time zone: UTC−5 (COT)

The Lower Western District is a subregion of the Colombian Department of Caldas.

- Anserma (Capital)
- Belalcazar
- Risaralda
- San José
- Viterbo
