= List of bridges in Colombia =

== Major bridges ==
This table presents a non-exhaustive list of the road and railway bridges with spans greater than 100 metres (328 ft).

Image		Name	Span	Length	Structural type	Carries Crosses	Opened	Location	Department	Ref.
	1	Pumarejo Bridge	380 m (1,250 ft)	2,173 m (7,129 ft)	Cable-stayed; Concrete box girder deck, concrete pylons 70+140+380+140+70	National road 90; Transversal del Caribe; Magdalena River	2019	Barranquilla–Palermo; 10°57′1.1″N 74°45′23.2″W	Atlántico; Magdalena	
	2	Hisgaura Bridge	330 m (1,080 ft)	653 m (2,142 ft)	Cable-stayed; Concrete girder deck, concrete pylons 125+330+125	National road 55ST; Hisgaura River	2020	San Andrés; 6°46′58.7″N 72°50′28.1″W	Santander	
	3	Provincial Viaduct	292 m (958 ft)	551 m (1,808 ft)	Cable-stayed; Concrete box girder deck, concrete pylons 129+292+129	Troncal Norte-sur; La Rosita Creek	2015	Bucaramanga; 7°6′28.4″N 73°7′49.1″W	Santander	
	4	Puente de Occidente	291 m (955 ft)		Suspension; Steel girder deck	Carrera K11; Santa Fe De Antioquia–Sopetran; Cauca River	1894	Santa Fe de Antioquia–Olaya; 6°34′40.6″N 75°47′53.8″W	Antioquia	(Note: The Occidente Bridge was declared national monument in 1967.)
	5	First Chirajara bridge collapsed in 2018	286 m (938 ft)	446 m (1,463 ft)	Cable-stayed; Composite steel/concrete deck, concrete pylons 69+286+69	National road 40; Chirajara Creek		Guayabetal; 4°12′7.2″N 73°47′46.1″W	Cundinamarca	
	6	New Honda Bridge	247 m (810 ft)	407 m (1,335 ft)	Cable-stayed; Concrete girder deck, concrete pylons 80+247+80	National road 45; Magdalena River	2019	Honda; 5°14′10.4″N 74°43′38.1″W	Tolima; Cundinamarca	
	7	Paso Real Bridge	218 m (715 ft)	310 m (1,020 ft)	Suspension; Steel truss girder deck, steel pylons	National road 62; Cauca River	1962	Santa Fe de Antioquia; 6°30′48.8″N 75°49′04.3″W	Antioquia	
	8	César Gaviria Trujillo Viaduct	211 m (692 ft)	704 m (2,310 ft)	Cable-stayed; Composite steel/concrete deck, concrete pylons 31+83+211+83+31	National road 29; Otún River	1997	Pereira–Dosquebradas; 4°49′3.1″N 75°41′10.2″W	Risaralda	
	9	Guillermo Gaviria Correa Bridge	200 m (660 ft)	917 m (3,009 ft)	Box girder Prestressed concrete 100+200+100	Road bridge Magdalena River	2006	Barrancabermeja–Yondó; 7°4′47.9″N 73°53′44″W	Santander; Antioquia	
	10	Puerto Berrío - Cimitarra Bridge	200 m (660 ft)(x2)	1,360 m (4,460 ft)	Box girder Prestressed concrete 140+2x200+140	Road bridge Magdalena River	2021	Puerto Berrío; 6°31′39.3″N 74°24′07.3″W	Antioquia; Santander	
	11	Ospina Maldonado Bridge	200 m (660 ft)		Suspension; Steel truss girder deck, steel pylons	Road bridge Magdalena River		Purificación; 3°51′04.1″N 74°55′50.0″W	Tolima	
	12	Chirajara Bridge under construction	192 m (630 ft)	421 m (1,381 ft)	Box girder Prestressed concrete 115+192+115	National road 40; Chirajara Creek	2023	Guayabetal; 4°12′7.2″N 73°47′46.1″W	Cundinamarca	
	13	El Tablazo Bridge	186 m (610 ft)(x2)	555 m (1,821 ft)	Box girder Prestressed concrete 82+2x186+82	Road bridge Sogamoso River; Sogamoso Dam reservoir	2015	Betulia; 7°02′18.2″N 73°20′29.3″W	Santander	
	14	Moravia Bridge	185 m (607 ft)	370 m (1,210 ft)	Box girder Prestressed concrete 92+185+92	Road bridge Medellín River	2016	Medellín; 6°17′03.5″N 75°34′03.6″W	Antioquia	
	15	Mata de Cacao Bridge	180 m (590 ft)		Box girder Prestressed concrete	National road 66; Mata de Cacao Creek	2015	San Juan de Girón; 7°06′26.7″N 73°21′40.4″W	Santander	
	16	Puerto Salgar Bridge	180 m (590 ft)	740 m (2,430 ft)	Box girder Prestressed concrete	Road bridge Magdalena River	2018	Puerto Salgar–La Dorada; 5°24′23.1″N 74°39′59.7″W	Cundinamarca; Caldas	
	17	Guillermo Gómez Ortiz Bridge	170 m (560 ft)(x2)	510 m (1,670 ft)	Box girder Prestressed concrete 85+2x170+85	Road bridge Sogamoso River	2013	San Juan de Girón–Zapatoca; 6°54′02.4″N 73°11′10.1″W	Santander	
	18	Talaigua Nuevo-Santa Ana Bridge	170 m (560 ft)	512 m (1,680 ft)	Box girder Prestressed concrete 127+170+127	Road bridge Magdalena River	2015	Talaigua Nuevo–Santa Ana; 9°18′57.7″N 74°34′03.5″W	Bolívar; Magdalena	
	19	Ferri Bridge	170 m (560 ft)	340 m (1,120 ft)	Box girder Prestressed concrete 85+170+85	National road 45; Putumayo River	2015	Puerto Asís; 0°34′58.3″N 76°34′39.6″W	Putumayo	
	20	New Cauca River Bridge	170 m (560 ft)	426 m (1,398 ft)	Box girder Prestressed concrete	Autopista al Mar 1 Cauca River	2022	Santa Fe de Antioquia; 6°30′42.7″N 75°49′14.1″W	Antioquia	
	21	Chucuri Bridge	170 m (560 ft)	340 m (1,120 ft)	Box girder Prestressed concrete 85+170+85	Road bridge				
	22	Cauca Tarso Bridge	169 m (554 ft)	495 m (1,624 ft)	Box girder Prestressed concrete Twin bridges 130+169+117	Autopista Conexión Pacífico 2 Cauca River	2021	Peñalisa; 5°56′08.6″N 75°51′00.0″W	Antioquia	
	23	Mariano Ospina Pérez Bridge (Valle del Cauca)	164 m (538 ft)	237 m (778 ft)	Suspension; Steel truss girder deck, steel pylons	Road bridge Cauca River	1954	La Unión–La Victoria; 4°31′31.4″N 76°02′37.0″W	Valle del Cauca	
	24	Eustaquio Palacios Bridge out of order	162 m (531 ft)	271 m (889 ft)	Suspension; Steel truss girder deck, steel pylons	Road bridge Cauca River	1926	Zarzal–Roldanillo; 4°24′18.2″N 76°06′04.9″W	Valle del Cauca	
	25	Roncador Bridge	160 m (520 ft)(x3)	2,300 m (7,500 ft)	Box girder Prestressed concrete 80+3x160+80	National road 78; Magdalena River	2017	Magangué–Cicuco; 9°18′19.6″N 74°40′40.3″W	Bolívar	
	26	Santa Lucía Bridge	160 m (520 ft)	1,000 m (3,300 ft)	Box girder Prestressed concrete	National road 78; Magdalena River	2017	Magangué–Cicuco; 9°17′31.0″N 74°42′35.2″W	Bolívar	
	27	Servitá Bridge	156 m (512 ft)	212 m (696 ft)	Box girder Prestressed concrete Twin bridges 28+156+28	National road 40; Servitá Creek		Villavicencio; 4°10′32.5″N 73°42′16.9″W	Meta	
	28	Geo Von Lengerke Bridge	155 m (509 ft)	391 m (1,283 ft)	Box girder Prestressed concrete 77+155+77	Road bridge Sogamoso River	2014	San Juan de Girón–Betulia; 6°57′05.5″N 73°13′58.0″W	Santander	
	29	El Tigre Viaduct	152 m (499 ft)	304 m (997 ft)	Box girder Prestressed concrete 75+152+75	National road 40; El Tigre Creek	2010	Cajamarca; 4°25′15.6″N 75°23′00.5″W	Tolima	
	30	Monumental Bridge	150 m (490 ft)	540 m (1,770 ft)	Truss; Steel; Railroad bridge 150+5x76	National road 62; Ferrocarril del Atlántico; Magdalena River	1961	Puerto Berrío; 6°28′56.4″N 74°24′01.2″W	Antioquia; Santander	
	31	Segundo Centenario Bridge	150 m (490 ft)	298 m (978 ft)	Box girder Prestressed concrete 74+150+74	Road bridge Calle 41; Sinú River	2006	Montería; 8°46′01.7″N 75°52′59.4″W	Córdoba	
	32	New San Jorge River Bridge	150 m (490 ft)	150 m (490 ft)	Arch; Steel tied arch Bow-string bridge	National road 25; San Jorge River	2015	La Apartada; 8°04′02.5″N 75°21′29.7″W	Córdoba	
	33	Enrique Santos Castillo Bridge	150 m (490 ft)	407 m (1,335 ft)	Box girder Prestressed concrete 75+150+75	Honda–Puerto Salgar–Girardot Highway; Magdalena River	2018	Girardot–Flandes; 4°15′56.0″N 74°52′29.6″W	Cundinamarca; Tolima	
	34	Gualanday Viaduct	149 m (489 ft)(x3)	604 m (1,982 ft)	Box girder Prestressed concrete 77+3x149+77	National road 40; Guacari Creek	2014	Gualanday; 4°17′28.0″N 75°02′04.4″W	Tolima	
	35	Banadia River Bridge	146 m (479 ft)	146 m (479 ft)	Arch; Steel tied arch Bow-string bridge	Road bridge Banadia River		Saravena; 6°54′43.9″N 71°48′02.2″W	Arauca	
	36	La Pintada Bridge	144 m (472 ft)		Suspension; Steel truss girder deck, steel pylons	Road bridge Cauca River	1945	La Pintada; 5°44′40.6″N 75°36′16.5″W	Antioquia	
	37	Miraflores Bridge (Gama-Gachalá)	142 m (466 ft)	212 m (696 ft)	Box girder Prestressed concrete 30+142+40	National road 50; Guavio River; Alberto Lleras Dam Reservoir	1991	Gachalá; 4°42′26.8″N 73°32′57.3″W	Cundinamarca	
	38	Laureano Gómez bridge closed	140 m (460 ft)	1,500 m (4,900 ft)	Cable-stayed; Concrete deck and cable-stays, concrete pylons 69+140+69	National road 90; Transversal del Caribe; Magdalena River	1974	Barranquilla–Palermo; 10°57′2.1″N 74°45′27″W	Atlántico; Magdalena	
	39	Bicentennial Arch Viaduct	140 m (460 ft)	140 m (460 ft)	Arch; Steel tied arch Bow-string bridge	Road bridge	2012	El Colegio; 4°35′40.8″N 74°22′57.2″W	Cundinamarca	
	40	Paso Del Colegio Bridge (2015)	140 m (460 ft)	170 m (560 ft)	Arch; Steel tied arch Bow-string bridge	National road 24; Magdalena River	2015	Gigante; 2°27′46.9″N 75°34′00.8″W	Huila	
	41	Tienditas Bridge	140 m (460 ft)	280 m (920 ft)	Box girder Prestressed concrete 70+140+70	Road Bridge; Footbridge; Táchira River	2016	Cúcuta–Tienditas; 7°52′36.0″N 72°27′10.5″W	Norte de Santander; Venezuela	
	42	Pipiral East Viaduct	140 m (460 ft)(x3)	775 m (2,543 ft)	Box girder Prestressed concrete 75+3x140+75	National road 40	2019	Villavicencio; 4°11′31.2″N 73°42′56.5″W	Meta	
	43	Cajamarca Bridge (2012)	137 m (449 ft)	282 m (925 ft)	Box girder Prestressed concrete 71+137+71	National road 40; Anaime River	2012	Cajamarca; 4°26′29.2″N 75°25′24.5″W	Tolima	
	44	Puerto Lleras Bridge	135 m (443 ft)	270 m (890 ft)	Cable-stayed; Composite steel/concrete deck, concrete pylons 70+135+70	Road bridge Ariari River	2017	Puerto Lleras; 3°15′59.2″N 73°22′44.7″W	Meta	
	45	Girardot Railway Bridge	130 m (430 ft)	466 m (1,529 ft)	Truss; Steel	Ferrocarril del Tolima-Huila; Magdalena River	1930	Girardot–Flandes; 4°17′37.4″N 74°48′40.5″W	Cundinamarca; Tolima	
	46	General Santander Bridge destroyed	130 m (430 ft)	250 m (820 ft)	Suspension; Steel truss girder deck, steel pylons	Road bridge Cauca River	1940	Tuluá–Riofrío; 4°07′25.7″N 76°16′09.7″W	Valle del Cauca	
	47	Antonio Escobar Camargo Bridge	130 m (430 ft)	1,073 m (3,520 ft)	Box girder Prestressed concrete	National road 80; Magdalena River	1997	Plato; 9°47′15.3″N 74°48′52.2″W	Magdalena	
	48	Balseadero Viaduct	130 m (430 ft)(x4)	1,708 m (5,604 ft)	Box girder Prestressed concrete 70+4x130+70	National road 37; Magdalena River	2015	Garzón–El Agrado; 2°13′51.6″N 75°38′57.9″W	Huila	
	49	Tame River Bridge	130 m (430 ft)		Arch; Steel tied arch Bow-string bridge	Road bridge Tame River		Tame; 6°25′04.7″N 71°44′38.7″W	Arauca	
	50	Gualanday II Viaduct	128 m (420 ft)(x2)	760 m (2,490 ft)	Box girder Prestressed concrete 93+113+2x128+113+93	National road 40; Guacari Creek	2019	Gualanday; 4°17′14.1″N 75°02′07.8″W	Tolima	
	51	Ibagué Bypass Bridge	127 m (417 ft)	284 m (932 ft)	Box girder Prestressed concrete 63+127+63	National road 40TLC; Combeima River	1998	Ibagué; 4°24′17.2″N 75°10′54.4″W	Tolima	
	52	Pipiral West Viaduct	125 m (410 ft)(x3)	545 m (1,788 ft)	Box girder Prestressed concrete 62+3x125+62	National road 40	2002	Villavicencio; 4°11′29.3″N 73°42′58.2″W	Meta	
	53	Puerto Bello Caquetá Bridge	125 m (410 ft)		Arch; Steel tied arch Bow-string bridge	Road bridge Fragua River	2007	Piamonte; 1°08′26.9″N 76°16′54.4″W	Cauca; Caquetá	
	54	Hormiguero Bridge	124 m (407 ft)	162 m (531 ft)	Arch; Steel tied arch Bow-string bridge	Road bridge Cauca River	2005	Hormiguero; 3°18′06.2″N 76°28′37.5″W	Valle del Cauca; Cauca	
	55	Pujamanes Bridge	122 m (400 ft)	244 m (801 ft)	Box girder Prestressed concrete 60+122+60	Road bridge Sogamoso River; Sogamoso Dam reservoir	2015	San Juan de Girón; 7°04′19.4″N 73°19′24.7″W	Santander	
	56	Envigado bridge	121 m (397 ft)	242 m (794 ft)	Cable-stayed; Concrete box girder deck, 1 concrete pylon 121+60	Carrera 48; Las Vegas Avenue; 37th Street	2006	Envigado; 6°10′25″N 75°35′32.5″W	Antioquia	
	57	Anacaro Bridge destroyed	120 m (390 ft)	296 m (971 ft)	Suspension; Steel truss girder deck, steel pylons	Road bridge Cauca River	1928	Anacaro; 4°47′04.3″N 75°58′06.8″W	Valle del Cauca	
	58	Carlos Holguín Bridge	120 m (390 ft)	199 m (653 ft)	Suspension; Steel truss girder deck, steel pylons	Road bridge Cauca River	1957	Cali–Juanchito; 3°27′01.7″N 76°28′33.4″W	Valle del Cauca	
	59	Doménico Parma Bridge	120 m (390 ft)(x2)	240 m (790 ft)	Suspension; Concrete girder deck, 1 concrete pylon	National road 29CL; Chinchiná River	1991	Chinchiná; 4°59′52.8″N 75°35′50.5″W	Caldas	
	60	La Siberia Bridge	120 m (390 ft)		Arch; Steel tied arch Bow-string bridge	National road 65; Caguán River	1996	San Vicente del Caguán; 2°10′44.8″N 74°46′40.1″W	Caquetá	
	61	La Gazapa Bridge	120 m (390 ft)	240 m (790 ft)	Box girder Prestressed concrete 60+120+60	Calle 8N; Pamplonita River	2008	Cúcuta; 7°54′33.2″N 72°28′55.5″W	Norte de Santander	
	62	Humea Bridge	120 m (390 ft)	316 m (1,037 ft)	Box girder Prestressed concrete 60+120+60	Road bridge Humea River	2009	Cabuyaro; 4°10′28.9″N 72°59′52.7″W	Meta	
	63	La Paz Bridge (2013)	120 m (390 ft)	180 m (590 ft)	Box girder Steel; V-shaped legs	National road 66; Sogamoso River	2013	San Juan de Girón–Betulia; 7°06′19.7″N 73°24′58.0″W	Santander	
	64	Nechí River Bridge (Zaragoza)	120 m (390 ft)	240 m (790 ft)	Box girder Prestressed concrete 60+120+60	Autopista Conexión Norte; Nechí River	2019	Zaragoza; 7°31′46.8″N 74°51′47.1″W	Antioquia	
	65	La Amistad Bridge (Ariari River)	120 m (390 ft)(x3)		Box girder Prestressed concrete	Road bridge Ariari River	2020	San Luís de Cubarral; 3°46′30.8″N 73°51′26.9″W	Meta	
	66	Río Sucío Viaduct	120 m (390 ft)(x3)	660 m (2,170 ft)	Box girder Prestressed concrete	Bucaramanga-Barrancabermeja-Yondó Corridor; Río Sucío	2022	Lebrija; 7°11′14.3″N 73°19′27.0″W	Santander	
	67	Juanchito Bridge	120 m (390 ft)	198 m (650 ft)	Box girder Prestressed concrete Twin bridges	Road bridge Cauca River	2022	Cali–Juanchito; 3°27′02.6″N 76°28′33.3″W	Valle del Cauca	
	68	Saldaña River Bridge	120 m (390 ft)	120 m (390 ft)	Arch; Steel tied arch Bow-string bridge	National road 45; Saldaña River		Saldaña; 3°56′04.4″N 75°01′07.9″W	Tolima	
	69	Paso Del Colegio Bridge	116 m (381 ft)		Suspension; Steel truss girder deck, steel pylons	Road bridge Magdalena River		Gigante; 2°27′46.6″N 75°34′01.5″W	Huila	
	70	Antonio Nariño Bridge	115 m (377 ft)		Arch; Steel tied arch Bow-string bridge	Road bridge Bogotá River	2007	Tocaima; 4°26′51.1″N 74°38′33.7″W	Cundinamarca	
	71	El Alcaraván Bridge	115 m (377 ft)(x3)		Arch; Steel tied arch Bow-string bridge	National road 65A; Ariari River		Granada; 3°30′00.9″N 73°43′55.7″W	Meta	
	72	Quebrada Blanca Bridge	114 m (374 ft)	114 m (374 ft)	Arch; Steel tied arch Bow-string bridge	Road bridge Río Negro		Guayabetal; 4°14′01.9″N 73°49′09.2″W	Cundinamarca	
	73	La Unión Viaduct	111 m (364 ft)	277 m (909 ft)	Box girder Prestressed concrete	Road bridge Avenida Floridablanca	2016	Bucaramanga; 7°05′53.8″N 73°06′39.7″W	Santander	
	74	Mediacanoa Bridge destroyed	110 m (360 ft)	242 m (794 ft)	Suspension; Steel truss girder deck, steel pylons	Road bridge Cauca River	1927	Mediacanoa; 3°53′24.0″N 76°21′01.1″W	Valle del Cauca	
	75	Paso del Comercio Bridge	110 m (360 ft)	169 m (554 ft)	Suspension; Steel truss girder deck, steel pylons	Road bridge Cauca River	1951	Cali; 3°29′32.8″N 76°28′59.6″W	Valle del Cauca	
	76	Girardot Bypass Magdalena River Bridge	110 m (360 ft)	173 m (568 ft)	Box girder Prestressed concrete Twin bridges 31+110+31	National road 45TLG; Magdalena River	2006	Girardot; 4°15′25.4″N 74°47′09.0″W	Cundinamarca	
	77	El Guamuez Bridge	110 m (360 ft)	220 m (720 ft)	Box girder Prestressed concrete 54+110+54	National road 45; Guamués River	2015	La Hormiga; 0°29′17.9″N 76°50′11.0″W	Putumayo	
	78	Chicamocha River Bridge	110 m (360 ft)		Arch; Steel tied arch Bow-string bridge	National road 55; Chicamocha River		La Palmera; 6°30′46.5″N 72°41′33.3″W	Boyacá; Santander	
	79	Gilberto Echeverri Mejía Bridge	108 m (354 ft)	560 m (1,840 ft)	Cable-stayed; Concrete box girder deck, concrete pylons 53+108+53	Calle 2 Sur; Medellín River	2012	Medellín; 6°12′13.9″N 75°34′45.1″W	Antioquia	
	80	Navarro Bridge	106 m (348 ft)	167 m (548 ft)	Cantilever; Steel	Footbridge; Former road bridge Magdalena River	1899	Honda; 5°12′9.3″N 74°43′59.7″W	Tolima; Cundinamarca	
	81	Simaña Bridge	105 m (344 ft)	105 m (344 ft)	Arch; Steel tied arch Bow-string bridge	National road 45; Simaña River	2007	Pelaya; 8°39′14.8″N 73°38′49.3″W	Cesar	
	82	Antonio Roldan Betancur Bridge	104 m (341 ft)(x2)	248 m (814 ft)	Cable-stayed; Concrete girder deck, 3 concrete pylons 20+2x104+20	Road bridge Cauca River	1992	Cáceres; 7°35′01.2″N 75°20′54.8″W	Antioquia	
	83	Puerto Valencia Bridge	104 m (341 ft)		Arch; Steel tied arch Bow-string bridge	National road 37	2014	Puerto Valencia; 2°29′58.1″N 75°58′00.2″W	Cauca; Huila	
	84	Pericos Viaduct	100 m (330 ft)	195 m (640 ft)	Box girder Prestressed concrete 26+100+50	National road 40		Ibagué; 4°24′52.8″N 75°19′13.8″W	Tolima	
	85	Unete Bridge	100 m (330 ft)		Arch; Steel tied arch Bow-string bridge	National road 62; Unete River		Aguazul; 5°12′22.6″N 72°36′05.1″W	Casanare	
	86	Carlos Lleras Restrepo Bridge		1,064 m (3,491 ft)	Beam bridge Prestressed concrete	Autopista Conexión Norte; Cauca River	1996	Caucasia; 7°58′14.7″N 75°11′17.9″W	Antioquia	
	87	Bocas Bridge			Suspension; Steel truss girder deck, steel pylons	Road bridge Cauca River		La Pintada; 5°44′02.4″N 75°35′57.5″W	Antioquia	
	88	José María Córdoba Bridge			Suspension; Steel truss girder deck, steel pylons	National road 60; Cauca River	1954	Bolombolo; 5°57′59.9″N 75°50′30.4″W	Antioquia	
	89	La Iglesias Bridge			Suspension; Steel truss girder deck, steel pylons	Road bridge Cauca River		Puente Iglesias; 5°49′47.8″N 75°42′28.5″W	Antioquia	
	90	Mariano Ospina Pérez Bridge (Girardot)			Suspension; Steel truss girder deck, steel pylons	National road 45; Magdalena River	1950	Girardot–Flandes; 4°17′18.1″N 74°48′32.8″W	Cundinamarca; Tolima	
	91	Gambote Bridge			Box girder Prestressed concrete	National road 90; Canal del Dique	2015	Gambote; 10°09′40.7″N 75°17′54.8″W	Bolívar	
	92	Samaná Norte River Bridge			Arch; Steel tied arch Bow-string bridge	National road 60; Samaná Norte River		San Luis; 5°59′59.1″N 74°56′16.8″W	Antioquia	
	93	Jose Ignacio Andrade Bridge			Suspension; Steel truss girder deck, steel pylons	National road 50; Magdalena River		Honda; 5°12′23.6″N 74°44′3.7″W	Tolima; Cundinamarca	
	94	Puerto Valdivia Bridge			Truss; Steel	National road 25; Cauca River	1960	Puerto Valdivia; 7°17′18.4″N 75°23′36.2″W	Antioquia	
	95	Old La Paz Bridge			Suspension; Steel truss girder deck, steel pylons	Road bridge Sogamoso River		San Juan de Girón–Betulia; 7°06′20.1″N 73°24′58.4″W	Santander	
	96	Cravo Norte River Bridge			Arch; Steel tied arch Bow-string bridge	Road bridge Cravo Norte River		Cravo Norte; 6°18′16.0″N 70°12′44.1″W	Arauca	
	97	La Peligrosa Viaduct		430 m (1,410 ft)	Box girder Prestressed concrete	Bucaramanga-Barrancabermeja-Yondó Corridor; La Peligrosa Creek	2022	Lebrija; 7°10′23.8″N 73°23′35.8″W	Santander	
	98	Nowen Bridge		913 m (2,995 ft)	Box girder Prestressed concrete	National road 65; Guaviare River	1998	Puerto Concordia–Puerto Arturo; 2°34′15.1″N 72°45′05.4″W	Meta; Guaviare	
	99	Campo Dos Bridge			Suspension; Steel truss girder deck, steel pylons	Road bridge Sardinata River		Campo Dos; 8°29′15.9″N 72°37′52.0″W	Norte de Santander	
	100	Cajamarca Bridge (1959)		283 m (928 ft)	Truss; Steel	National road 40; Anaime River	1959	Cajamarca; 4°26′29.7″N 75°25′24.5″W	Tolima	
	101	Quebrada Blanca North Bridge		167 m (548 ft)	Cable-stayed; Concrete box girder deck, 1 concrete pylon	National road 40; Río Negro		Guayabetal; 4°14′10.0″N 73°49′10.8″W	Cundinamarca	

== See also ==
- Transport in Colombia
- Highways in Colombia
- Rail transport in Colombia
- Geography of Colombia
- List of rivers of Colombia
- es:Anexo:Carreteras nacionales de Colombia (in Spanish) - Annex: National highways of Colombia
