= La Esmeralda Dam =

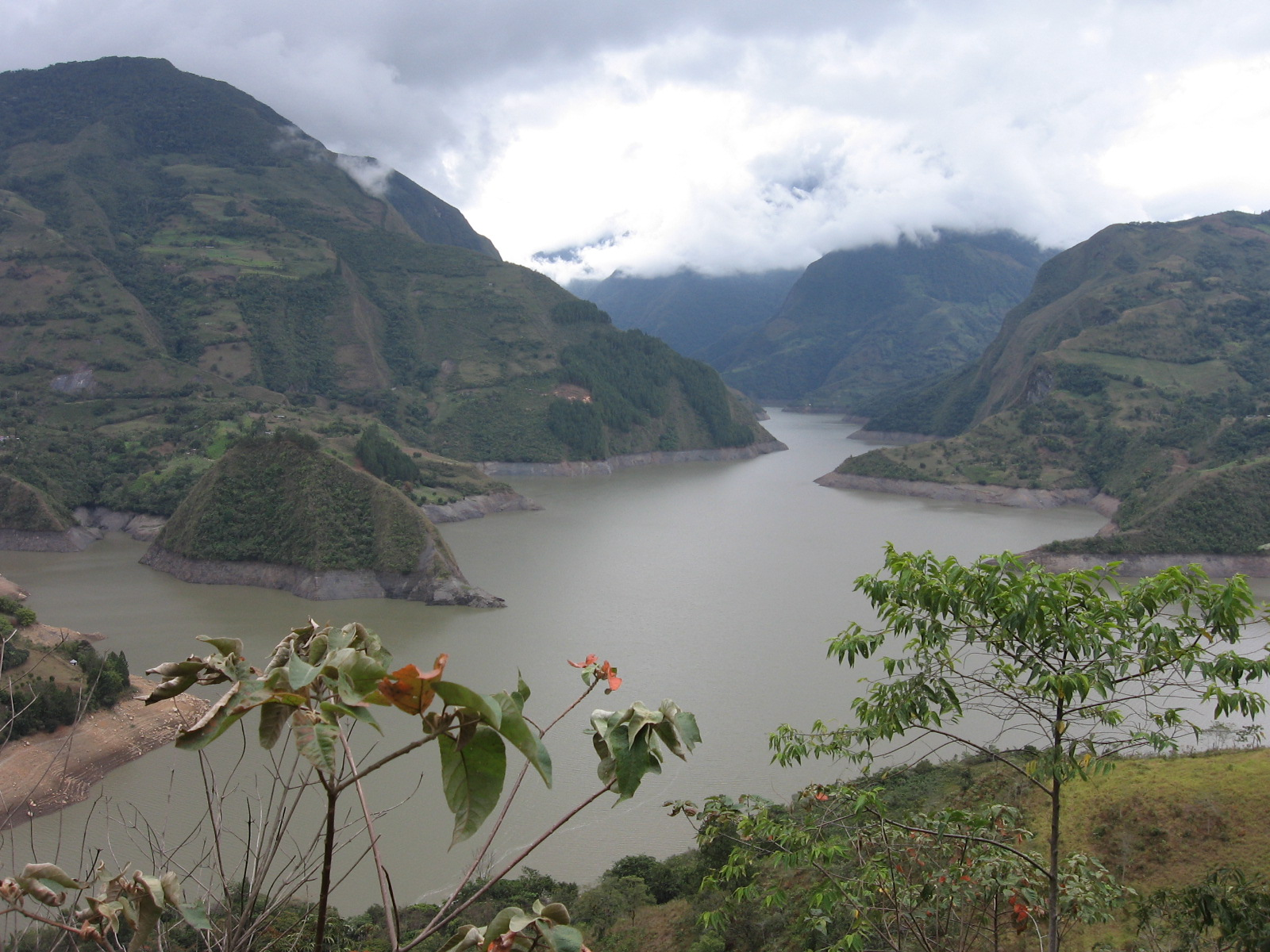
- The dam's reservoir

- VALLE DE TENZA
- Official name: Presa La Esmeralda
- Country: Colombia
- Location: Santa María, Neira Province
- Coordinates: 04°54′03″N 73°17′49″W
- Status: Operational
- Construction began: 1960
- Opening date: 1976
- Construction cost: $395 million

Dam and spillways
- Type of dam: Embankment, rock-fill
- Impounds: Batá River
- Height: 237 m (778 ft)
- Length: 310 m (1,020 ft)
- Dam volume: 11,500,000 m^{3} (410,000,000 cu ft)

Reservoir
- Creates: La Esmeralda Reservoir
- Total capacity: 758×10^{6} m^{3} (615,000 acre⋅ft)
- Active capacity: 680×10^{6} m^{3} (550,000 acre⋅ft)
- Surface area: 12.6 km (7.8 mi)
- Maximum length: 22 km (14 mi)
- Maximum width: 1 km (0.62 mi)
- Maximum water depth: 130 m (430 ft)
- Normal elevation: 1,200 m (3,900 ft)

Chivor Power Station
- Coordinates: 4°52′51.52″N 73°13′55.32″W
- Operator: AES Chivor
- Commission date: 1976–1982
- Turbines: 8 x 125 MW (168,000 hp) Pelton turbines
- Installed capacity: 1,000 MW (1,300,000 hp)
- Annual generation: 4,620×10^{6} kWh (1.66×10^{10} MJ)

La Esmeralda Dam is an embankment dam on the Batá River northwest of Santa María in Boyacá Department, Neira Province, Valle de Tenza (Tenza Valley) Colombia, 52 km to south of Tunja city. The primary purpose of the dam is hydroelectric power production and it is part of the Chivor Hydroelectric Project. Water from the Batá is diverted by the dam to a power station that discharges to the Lengupá River. The power station supplies 8% of Colombia's power demand.

== History ==
Initial studies for the project began in 1954. The idea behind the dam was to divert water from the Batá to the Lengupá which lies at a much lower elevation. This idea was originally suggested by a topographer at The Electric Promotion Institute and later contemplated by an American-French delegation that was helping to develop Colombia's Electrification Plan at the time. Colombia's president at the time, Gustavo Rojas Pinilla promoted the project as well and it was dubbed "Project Gustavo". In 1958, further studies including geological and hydrological began. The hydroelectric project was designed in two 500 MW stages and it became apparent that additional funding would be needed to construct it. In November 1970, Ingetec S.A — under the supervision of Interconexión Electrica S.A — began construction on stage one after receiving a World Bank loan. Stage one was complete in 1977 and a year prior, construction on stage two had started in June. By 1982, stage two was completed and inaugurated. Stage two required a World Bank loan as well. In 1996, operation and ownership of the dam and power plant was transferred from the public to the private sector.

== Dam ==
La Esmeralda dam is a 237-metre (778 ft) tall and 310-metre (1,020 ft) long central core rock-fill embankment dam with a structural volume of 11,500,000 cubic metres (410,000,000 cu ft). The dam's reservoir has a 758,000,000 cubic metres (615,000 acre⋅ft) capacity, of which 680,000,000 cubic metres (550,000 acre⋅ft) is active storage. The reservoir has a surface area of 12.6 km^{2} (5 mi^{2}) and a maximum depth of 130 metres (430 ft). Its maximum length is 22 kilometres (14 mi) at a normal elevation of 1,200 metres (3,900 ft) above sea level and its maximum width is 1 kilometre (0.62 mi). Helping to withhold the reservoir are two auxiliary dams.

== Chivor Power Station ==
Chivor Power Station, lies to the southeast and is fed with water from reservoir by two separate 7.6-kilometre (4.7 mi) long tunnels (stage one and two). Near the banks of the Lengupá River, the tunnels split into eight separate penstocks to supply each 125 megawatts (168,000 hp) Pelton turbine-generator with water. Once utilised for electricity, the water is discharged into the Lengupá. The normal drop in elevation from the reservoir to the power station is 130 metres (430 ft).

== See also ==
- List of power stations in Colombia
- List of conventional hydroelectric power stations
