= Magdalena Caldense Subregion =

Magdalena Caldense District Distrito Magdalena Caldense
- District
- Country: Colombia
- Department: Caldas
- Time zone: UTC−5 (COT)

Templo Nuestra Señora de la Asunción in the town of Florencia in Magdalena Caldense

The Magdalena Caldense District is a subregion of the Colombian Department of Caldas.

- La Dorada (Capital)
- Florencia
- Norcasia
- Samana
- Victoria
