= Risaralda =

Risaralda may refer to:

- Risaralda Department, an administrative division of Colombia
- Risaralda, Caldas a town and municipality in Caldas Department
