= La Miel River =

Coordinates: 05°46′13″N 74°40′19″W

La Miel

Location
- Country: Colombia

Physical characteristics
- Mouth
  - location: Magdalena River
- Length: 104 km (65 mi)
- Basin size: 1,105 km^{2} (427 sq mi)
- Discharge
  - average: 243 m^{3}/s (8,600 cu ft/s)

La Miel is a river in Colombia and a tributary of the Magdalena River. The river originates in the Cordillera Central of the Andes and its watershed is located within the Caldas Department. Tributaries of La Miel include the Tenerife, Salado, Manso, Moro, Pensilvania, Samana and Dulce rivers. The Miel I Dam is situated on the river.
