= San José Municipality =

San José Municipality may refer to:

- San José, Caldas, Colombia
- San José, El Petén, Honduras
- San José Municipality, Santa Cruz, Bolivia
