= Miel I Dam =

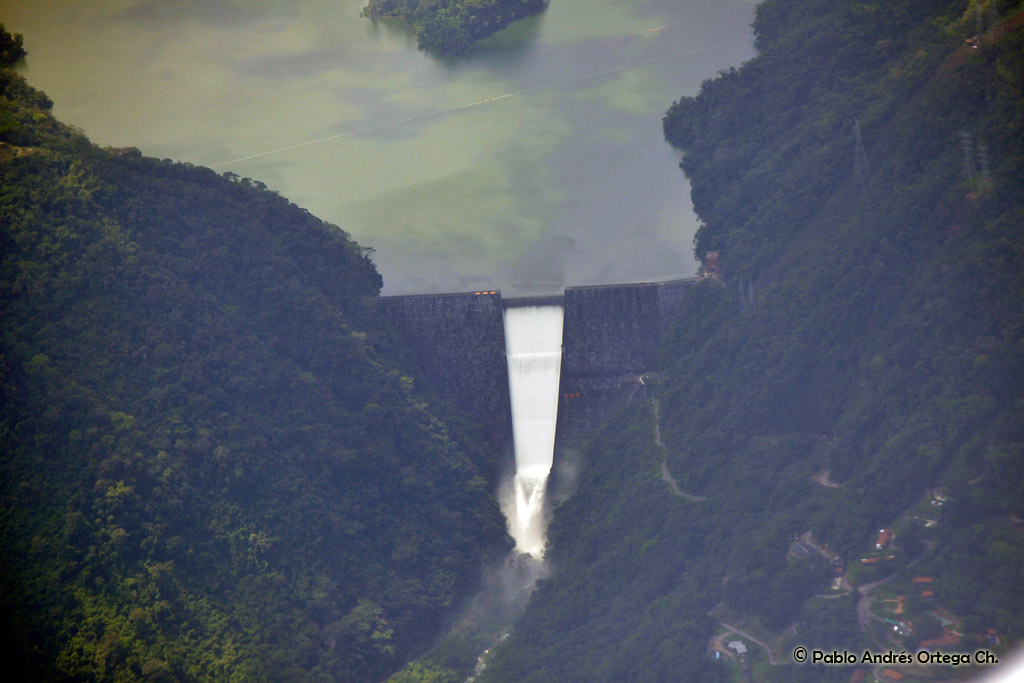
- The dam in 2011

- Location within Colombia
- Official name: Presa Patángoras
- Country: Colombia
- Location: Norcasia
- Coordinates: 05°33′38″N 74°53′12″W
- Status: Operational
- Construction began: 1997
- Opening date: 2002
- Owner: ISAGEN

Dam and spillways
- Type of dam: Gravity, roller-compacted concrete
- Impounds: La Miel River
- Height: 188 m (617 ft)
- Height (thalweg): 340 m (1,120 ft)
- Elevation at crest: 454 m (1,490 ft)
- Dam volume: 1,750,000 m^{3} (62,000,000 cu ft)
- Spillway type: Uncontrolled overflow
- Spillway capacity: 3,600 m^{3}/s (130,000 cu ft/s)

Reservoir
- Creates: Amani Reservoir
- Total capacity: 571,000,000 m^{3} (463,000 acre⋅ft)
- Catchment area: 770 km^{2} (300 sq mi)
- Surface area: 1,220 ha (3,000 acres)
- Normal elevation: 445.5 m (1,462 ft)
- Tidal range: plant_name = Miel I Hydroelectric Power Plant

Power Station
- Coordinates: 5°34′36.71″N 74°51′10.85″W
- Commission date: 2002
- Turbines: 3 x 132 MW (177,000 hp) Francis-type
- Installed capacity: 396 MW (531,000 hp)
- Annual generation: 1,146 GWh (4,130 TJ)

The Miel I Dam, officially known as the Patángoras Dam, is a gravity dam on La Miel River just south of Norcasia in Caldas Department, Colombia. The dam was constructed between 1997 and 2002 for the primary purpose of hydroelectric power generation. At the time of its completion, the dam was the tallest roller-compacted concrete (RCC) dam in the world but was surpassed by the Longtan Dam in 2009.

== Background ==
Designs for the dam were drawn up in 1992 and 1993 before bidding was carried out in December of that same year. An RCC design was chosen to reduce costs and risks associated with excavating a larger foundation for an arch dam. Funding was acquired for the project by December 1997 when construction began. The power plant was operational in 2002 and the project was completed in 59 months, seven months ahead of time. The dam is part of the Miel I Hydroelectric Station and is officially called the Patángoras Dam but is commonly referred to as the Miel I Dam.

The U.S. Army Corps of Engineers was involved in the testing of the concrete for the dam. Drums of aggregates, cement, sand and soil were shipped to their North Pacific Division Materials Laboratory in Troutdale, Oregon. The materials were separated and tested for various properties. RCC concrete cylinders and beams were batched and poured. Tests were performed, for 7, 28, 90, 180 and 365 days. Tests included compressive strength, tensile strength, expansion, and slow load beams. The testing required almost 2 years to complete.

== Design ==
The dam is a 340-metre (1,120 ft) long RCC gravity-type containing 1,750,000 cubic metres (2,290,000 cu yd) of concrete. It is located just east of the confluence of the Moro and La Miel Rivers. At the center of the structure and running down its downstream dace, is an uncontrolled overflow spillway with a nominal capacity of 1,720 cubic metres per second (61,000 cu ft/s) and maximum discharge capacity of 3,600 cubic metres per second (130,000 cu ft/s) (at the dam's crest elevation of 454 metres (1,490 ft)). A discharge tunnel is also located at the base of the dam, on its right bank, which has a capacity of 250 cubic metres per second (8,800 cu ft/s).

== Amani Reservoir ==
People taking pictures in front of the Amaní Reservoir

The reservoir created by the dam, Amani Reservoir (Embalse Amaní), has a storage capacity of 571 million cubic metres (463,000 acre⋅ft) and surface area of 1,220 hectares (3,000 acres). The reservoir's normal elevation above sea level is 445.5 metres (1,462 ft). On the left bank of the reservoir near the dam is the intake for the Miel I hydroelectric station which is controlled by two floodgates. In 2010, the Guarinó diversion dam on the Guarinó River was opened and the Manso diversion dam on the Manso River began operations in 2013. Both divert water into the Amani Reservoir through tunnels.

== Miel I Hydroelectric Power Plant ==
The Miel I hydroelectric power plant receives water from the dam via a 6.5-metre (21 ft) diameter tunnel which splits into three 3.35 metres (11.0 ft) diameter penstocks before reaching each turbine. The power house is located underground and contains a machine, transformer and surge tank chambers. Power is produced by three 132 megawatts (177,000 hp) Francis turbine generators for a total installed capacity of 396 megawatts (531,000 hp).

== See also ==
- List of power stations in Colombia
