= Guatapé River =

Coordinates: 6°11′16″N 74°47′13″W

Guatapé
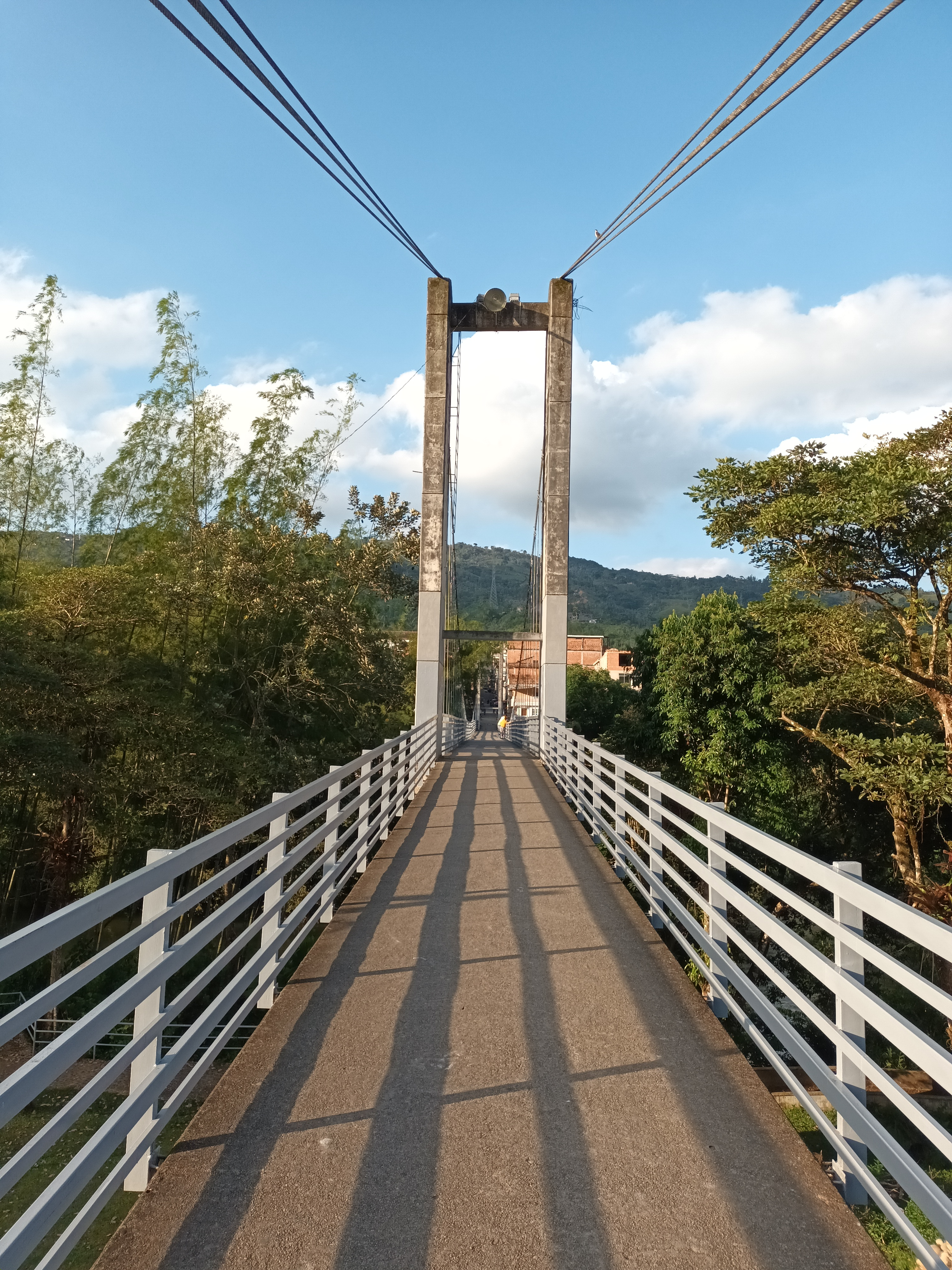
- Pedestrian bridge El Jardín over the Guatapé River as it passes through the municipality of San Rafael, Antioquia, Colombia.

Location
- Country: Colombia

Physical characteristics
- Mouth
  - location: Samaná Norte River

The Guatapé is a river in Antioquia Department, Colombia and a tributary of the Samaná Norte River. The Jaguas (170 MW), Las Playas (204 MW) and San Carlos (1240 MW) hydroelectric power plants are located on its stem.
