= Riosucio, Caldas =

- Municipality and town

- Flag Coat of arms

- Location of the municipality and town of Riosucio in the department of Caldas

- Location of Riosucio in Colombia
- Coordinates: 5°25′15″N 75°42′9″W
- Country: Colombia
- Department: Caldas Department
- Founded: August 7, 1819
- Founder: José Bonifacio Bonafont & José Ramón Bueno

Area
  - Total: 429.1 km^{2} (165.7 sq mi)
- Elevation: 1,783 m (5,850 ft)

Population (2009)
  - Total: 57,220
- Time zone: UTC-5 (Colombia Standard Time)
- Website: www.riosucio-caldas.gov.co

Riosucio is a town and municipality in the department of Caldas in Colombia. It is best known for its biennial carnival, officially called the Carnival of Riosucio but commonly known by its former name of the "Carnival of the Devil", and is one of the biggest and most popular carnivals in Colombia. Located along the Colombian coffee growing axis, the municipality was made part of the "Coffee Cultural Landscape" UNESCO World Heritage Site in 2011.

== Geography ==
The municipality is located in the west of the department. It is bounded by the municipality of Supía to the east, the municipality of Filadelfia to the south-east, the department of Risaralda to the south and west, and the department of Antioquia to the north. The total area of the municipality is 429.1 km^{2}. The town of Riosucio lies at an altitude of 1783 meters above sea level, 91 km west of the departmental capital Manizales.

== Climate ==
The average temperature is 20 °C (68 °F) all year round.

== Carnival of Riosucio ==
Riosucio's principal attraction is the Carnival of Riosucio, also known as the Carnival of the Devil, that takes place every two years (in odd-numbered years) in early January. It is one of the best known and most popular carnivals in Colombia, along with those of Barranquilla, Manizales and Pasto. Unlike those large cities, however, the small town of Riosucio is not equipped to host the tens of thousands of visitors that descend on the town for the festivities, and consequently accommodation is extremely difficult to come by: most of the town's hotels are fully booked months in advance, and many visitors resort to bringing a tent and camping where they can find space, or even simply sleeping rough on the streets.

The main participants in the processions are the cuadrillas: teams or squads of people, usually based around members of the same family or their relatives by marriage, who parade through the streets in costume on several of the carnival days. Although activities and partying take place all around the town, the focal points are the plazas outside the town's two main churches, San Sebastián (the red brick church of the upper town) and La Señora de la Candelaria (the cream and yellow painted church of the lower town), set just one block apart from each other. All the processions end at one or other of the plazas, and temporary stages set up in each plaza are used for the presentations made by the cuadrillas, and also for the live music and folkloric dance presentations that occur during the day and evenings of each day of the festival. The music is usually provided by salsa bands or chirimías - bands named after the woodwind instrument similar to a primitive oboe that they play, as well as guitars and drums.

With the exception of the Sunday, every day of the festival starts early and ends late. A musical band parades around town playing alboradas ("reveilles" or music at dawn) at 5 am each morning, and every night verbenas entertain the festival-goers with music for dancing late into the night. The official close to each day's events is midnight, but in practice impromptu verbenas carry on in the streets all night.

Although beer, rum and the staple Colombian liquor aguardiente are widely drunk, the traditional drink of the carnival is guarapo, a fermented sugar cane liquor traditionally drunk out of a gourd. This is the origin of the Gourd as one of the features of the carnival.

A large model of the Devil is the central figure of the carnival. There are also two other models: a She-Devil, and a Gourd. During the period of the carnival the Devil and She-Devil are not allowed to meet, and consequently the Devil is kept in one church square, and the She-Devil in the other square.

The carnival was declared an Event of Cultural Interest by the Colombian government in 2006.

=== Origins of the Carnival ===
During the 17th to the 19th centuries, two rival settlements at the foot of the Ingrumá Mountain were involved in a bitter dispute over territory and mining rights: the wealthier Spanish-descended community (with black African slaves) of Quiebralomo, and the indigenous Indian population of La Montaña. In 1814, the priests of the two communities, Doctor José Bonifacio Bonafont of Quiebralomo and José Ramón Bueno of La Montaña, instigated efforts to reconcile the two communities and create a new unified town. After years of effort the two rival groups agreed to share their territories and the town of Riosucio was created on August 7, 1819. This is the date when the town is considered to have been founded. Riosucio's unusual lay-out, with the two main churches just one block apart in the center of town, symbolizes the unification of the two former enemies.

Originally a statue of Jesus was placed between the two churches to mark the boundary of each parish and to separate the two communities. However, the people of each parish continued to visit each other's churches, so the statue was replaced by one of the Devil, in order to instil fear of crossing the boundary line. Despite the unification tensions persisted between the two communities, so in 1847 a carnival of unification took place, with the Devil as the symbol of this unification. The carnival took place on January 6 to celebrate the Feast of the Three Kings (Epiphany). The first regular carnival took place in 1912, and the Devil was adopted as the official "mascot" of the Carnival in 1915.

=== Carnival timetable ===
Although the festivities take place in January, the carnival is considered to start the previous July, when the "Republic of Riosucio" is formally declared, with a "president". A "decree" of the new "government" is read out, usually gently mocking the inhabitants of Riosucio.

The exact dates of the carnival change each year, but it always takes place on the six days from the Friday to the following Wednesday that include January 6, the anniversary of the date of the first festival. The key events of the carnival are summarized below.

==== Friday (first day) – Children's Carnival ====
- Alegre despertar (joyful awakening) – the opening procession which takes place at midnight and signifies the official start of the carnival festivities
- Children's procession – procession of the children's cuadrillas, followed by presentations by the cuadrillas on stage and activities for children

==== Saturday (second day) ====
- Gran Entrada de Colonias (Grand Entry of the Colonies) – procession to mark the return of Riosuceños who now live abroad, and their welcome by those who still live in Riosucio
- Entrada Triunfal de su Majestad el Diablo (Triumphal Entry of His Majesty the Devil) – evening procession

==== Sunday (third day) – Magnificent Day of the Adult Teams ====
- Grandioso Desfile de Cuadrillas de Mayores – the most important day of the festival, it begins with the procession of the cuadrillas in the morning. Beginning in the early afternoon, each cuadrilla must perform two songs at each of the temporary stages erected in the plaza outside the two churches. The music of the songs is normally a well-known Latin or pop song, but the lyrics must be entirely original and written by one or more members of the cuadrilla. These lyrics may relate to the carnival, or to socio-economic issues. As well as performing on stage, each cuadrilla also performs at various private houses around the town where the inhabitants may not be able to go out due to old age or disability. As a result, and due to the large number of cuadrillas taking part, the performances may go on well into the night.

==== Monday (fourth day) – Day of Riosucenian Brotherhood ====
- Procession of Riosucenian Brotherhood
- First day of corralejas – the exhibition takes place in the town's bullring and is similar to a cross between a rodeo and bullfighting, but in Riosucio's carnival the bulls are not harmed
- Procession of Candles
- Noches del Ingrumá: night-time firework display

==== Tuesday (fifth day) – Day of Individual Costumes ====
- Second day of corralejas

==== Wednesday (sixth day) – Last Day ====
- Procession of the Gourd
- Final day of correlejas
- The closing ceremony of the carnival – at midnight the Gourd is buried and the devil is burnt, signifying the official end of the festival. The Devil that is burnt is not the original Devil paraded around town, but a papier-mâché replica made just for that year's carnival.
