= Punchiná Dam =

- Location within Colombia
- Official name: Presa Punchiná
- Country: Colombia
- Location: San Carlos
- Coordinates: 06°12′39″N 74°50′26″W
- Status: Operational
- Opening date: 1984
- Owner: ISAGEN

Dam and spillways
- Type of dam: Embankment, earth-fill
- Impounds: Guatapé River
- Height: 70 m (230 ft)
- Length: 800 m (2,600 ft)
- Elevation at crest: 785 m (2,575 ft)
- Dam volume: 6,000,000 m^{3} (210,000,000 cu ft)

Reservoir
- Creates: Punchiná Reservoir
- Total capacity: 72×10^{6} m^{3} (58,000 acre⋅ft)
- Active capacity: 52.23×10^{6} m^{3} (42,340 acre⋅ft)
- Surface area: 3.4 km^{2} (1.3 sq mi)

Power Station
- Commission date: Stage I: 1984; Stage II: 1987
- Turbines: 8 x 155 MW (208,000 hp) Pelton-type
- Installed capacity: 1,240 MW (1,660,000 hp)

The Punchiná Dam is an embankment dam on the Guatapé River 17 kilometres (11 mi) east of San Carlos in Antioquia Department, Colombia. The dam creates Punchiná Reservoir, which is part of the 1,240 megawatts (1,660,000 hp) San Carlos Hydroelectric Power Plant. The power plant was completed in two 620 megawatts (830,000 hp) stages; the first was completed in 1984 and the second in 1987. It is the largest power station in Colombia.

== Background ==
The project was initiated by Interconexión Eléctrica S.A. in 1973 and appraised in 1978. In May 1978, a World Bank loan was approved to help fund the dam and both stages of the power plant. Construction began in 1979, the dam was completed in 1983 and the last generator of stage one was operational in 1984. Stage two's final generator was operational in December 1987. The commissioning of stage two was originally slated for 1984 and stage one for 1983 but was delayed due to financial problems and redesigns. The total cost of stage one was US$443.7 million and stage two US$166.3 million.

== Design and operation ==
The Punchiná Dam is a 70-metre (230 ft) tall and 800-metre (2,600 ft) long embankment-type dam with 6,000,000 cubic metres (210,000,000 cu ft) of fill and a crest elevation of 785 metres (2,575 ft).

== Punchiná Reservoir ==
The reservoir created by the dam has a capacity of 72 million cubic metres (58,000 acre⋅ft), of which 52.23 million cubic metres (42,340 acre⋅ft) is active capacity. The surface area of the reservoir is 3.4 square kilometres (1.3 sq mi).

== San Carlos Hydroelectric Power Plant ==
Initiating the flow of water towards the power station are two 54-metre (177 ft) tall intake towers behind the dam in the reservoir. Each tower provides water to a respective stage of the power plant via tunnels. The two tunnels are each about 4.5 kilometres (2.8 mi) long and to protect against water hammer, each tunnel is equipped with a surge tank. The underground power house is 400 metres (1,300 ft) below the surface, 203 metres (666 ft) long, 19.65 metres (64.5 ft) wide and 27.5 metres (90 ft) high. Adjacent to the power house is another cavern that holds the transformers and is of similar dimensions. Once the water reaches the power house, each tunnel supplies the four 155 megawatts (208,000 hp) Pelton turbines of its respective stage. Once the water leaves the turbines, each stage releases it into their own 1.5 kilometres (0.93 mi) long tailrace tunnel where the water is discharged into the Samaná Norte River. The tunnels have a combined maximum discharge of 330 cubic metres per second (12,000 cu ft/s).

== See also ==
- List of power stations in Colombia
