= Pachavita =

- Municipality and town
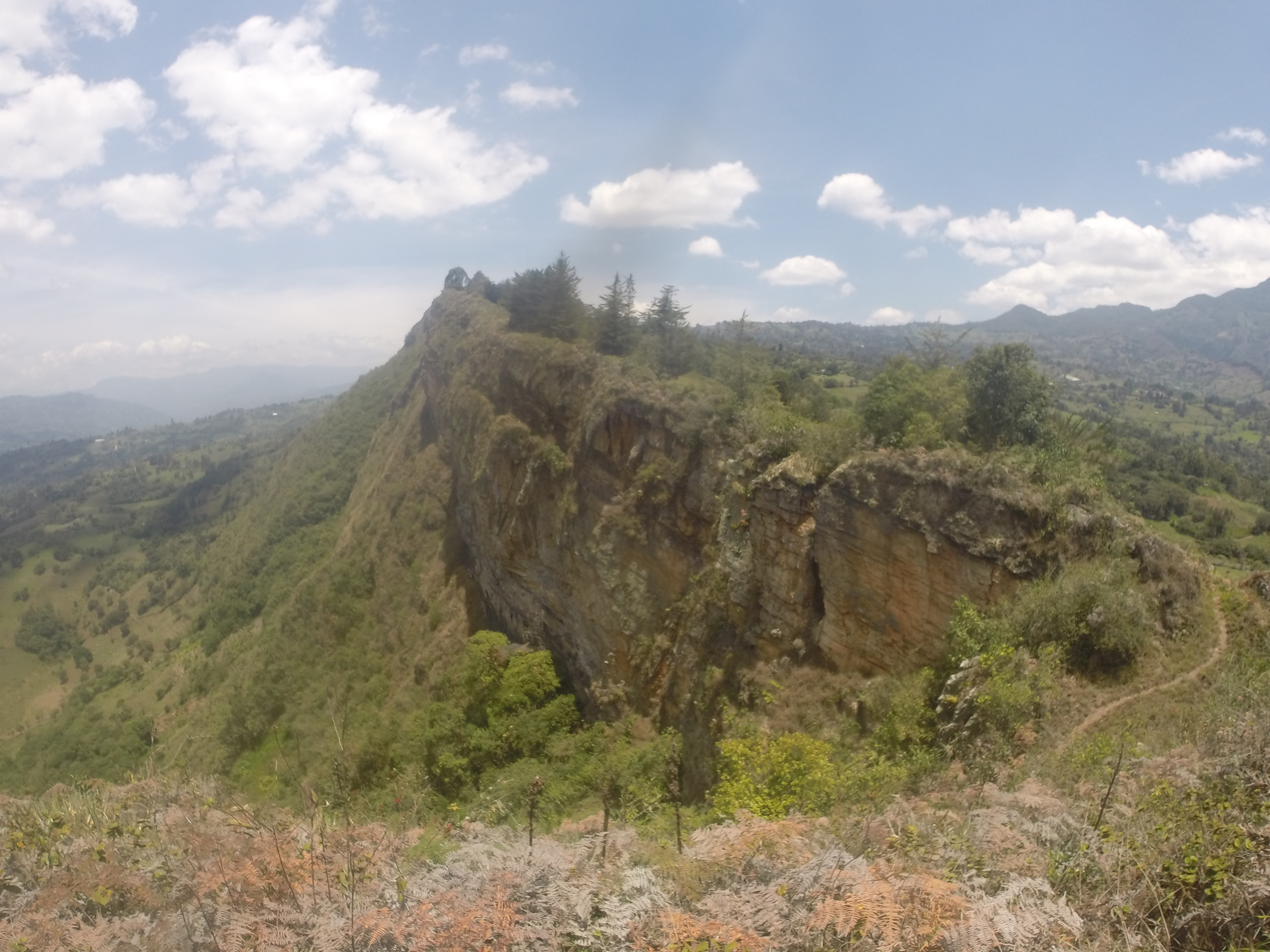
- View of mountain within Pachavita

- Flag

- Location of the municipality and town of Pachavita in Boyacá
- Coordinates: 5°08′N 73°24′W
- Country: Colombia
- Department: Boyacá Department
- Province: Neira Province
- Founded: 17 November 1716

Government
  - Mayor: José Fernando Roa Orjuela (2020-2023)

Area
  - Municipality and town: 68 km^{2} (26 sq mi)
- Elevation: 1,985 m (6,512 ft)

Population (2015)
  - Municipality and town: 2,508
  - Urban: 395
- Time zone: UTC-5 (Colombia Standard Time)
- Website: Official website

Pachavita is a town and municipality in the Neira Province, part of the Colombian department of Boyacá. The urban centre is situated on the Altiplano Cundiboyacense at an altitude of 1,985 metres (6,512 ft) and at a distance of 85 kilometres (53 mi) from the department capital Tunja. The municipality borders Chinavita in the north, Tenza and La Capilla in the south, Garagoa in the east and Úmbita in the west.

== Etymology ==
The name Pachavita is derived from Chibcha; pacha = man, lord and vita = point, summit, peak; "Peak of the man". Another meaning is "Proud chief".

== History ==
Before the arrival of the Spanish conquistadores, the area of Pachavita was part of the loose Muisca Confederation. The Muisca had different rulers and the zaque of Hunza ruled over Pachavita.

Modern Pachavita was founded on November 17, 1716.

== Economy ==
Main economical activity of Pachavita are agriculture and dairy farming with products yuca, maize, bananas, arracacha, beans, lulo and cucumbers, eggs, peas and cheese.
