= Chinavita =

Coordinates: 5°10′00″N 73°22′02″W

- Municipality and town
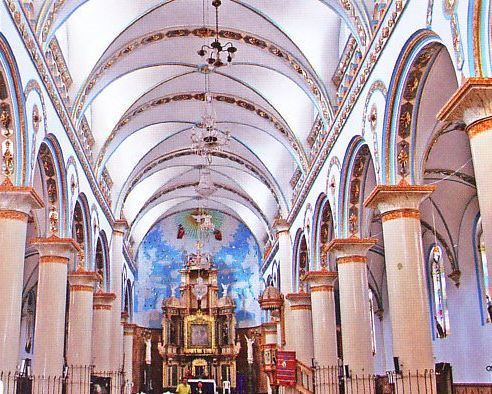
- Interior of the church of Chinavita

- Flag

- Location of the municipality and town of Chinavita in the Boyacá department of Colombia
- Country: Colombia
- Department: Boyacá Department
- Province: Neira Province
- Founded: 12 September 1822
- Founder: José Joaquín Ramírez Zubieta

Government
  - Mayor: Fiyer Alexander Urrego Bejarano (2020-2023)

Area
  - Municipality and town: 148 km^{2} (57 sq mi)
  - Urban: 0.39 km^{2} (0.15 sq mi)
- Elevation: 1,763 m (5,784 ft)

Population (2015)
  - Municipality and town: 3,528
  - Density: 23.8/km^{2} (61.7/sq mi)
  - Urban: 1,219
- Time zone: UTC-5 (Colombia Standard Time)
- Website: Official website

Chinavita is a town and municipality in the Neira Province, part of the Colombian department of Boyacá. The urban centre of Chinavita is located at 39 kilometres (24 mi) from the department capital Tunja on the Altiplano Cundiboyacense and the municipality borders Tibaná and Ramiriquí in the north, Ramiriquí and Miraflores in the east, Garagoa in the south and in the west Pachavita and Úmbita.

== Etymology ==
The name Chinavita is derived from Chibcha and means "illuminated hilltop". Another explanation is "our hill".

== History ==
The area of Chinavita before the Spanish conquest was inhabited by the Muisca. Chinavita was ruled by the zaque of Hunza.

Modern Chinavita was founded in 1822, before it was a vereda of Garagoa.

== Economy ==
Main economical activities of Chinavita are agriculture and livestock farming. Agricultural products cultivated in Chinavita are potatoes, sugarcane, tomatoes, bananas, coffee and fique.
