= List of power stations in Colombia =

This article contains a list of power stations in Colombia. Hydroelectric power accounts for 70 percent of Colombia's generating capacity.

== Coal ==
=== In service ===
Station	Capacity (MW)	Location	Refs
CPR Plant	150	Boyaca	1 unit
Termoguajira	330	Guajira	2 units
Termopaipa	160	Boyaca	1 unit
Termozipa	235.5	Cundinamarca	4 units
Termotasajero I	155(net)	Norte de Santander	
Termotasajero II	161.6(net)	Norte de Santander	
Termotasajero III	200(net)	Norte de Santander	Bidding

== Gas ==
=== In service ===
Station	Capacity (MW)	Location	Refs
Termobarranquilla S.A. (E.S.P) TEBSA	918 MW		

== Hydroelectric ==
=== In service ===
Station	Location	Capacity (MW)	Refs
San Carlos Hydroelectric Power Plant		1,240	
Alberto Lleras (Guavio) Dam		1,150	
Chivor Hydroelectric Project		1,000	
Sogamoso Dam		820	
Porce III Dam		660	
Peñol-Guatapé Dam		560	
Miel I Hydroelectric Station		396	
Urra Dam		340	
Las Playas Dam		204	
Jaguas Dam		170	
Río Amoyá Dam		80	
Calderas Dam		26	

=== Proposed or under construction ===
Station	Capacity (MW)	Location	Notes
Ituango Dam	2,456		Under construction
Guaicaramo Dam	1,750		Proposed

== See also ==
- List of power stations in South America
- List of largest power stations in the world
