= Dendropsophus garagoensis =

Conservation status
- Least Concern (IUCN 3.1)

Scientific classification
- Kingdom: Animalia
- Phylum: Chordata
- Class: Amphibia
- Order: Anura
- Family: Hylidae
- Genus: Dendropsophus
- Species: D. garagoensis

Binomial name
- Dendropsophus garagoensis (Kaplan, 1991)

Synonyms
- Hyla garagoensis Kaplan, 1991

Species of frog

Dendropsophus garagoensis is a species of frog in the family Hylidae. It is endemic to the eastern slope of the Cordillera Oriental in Boyacá Department, Colombia. Common name Garagoa treefrog has been proposed for it.

== Etymology ==
The frog has been found in and named after Garagoa, Boyacá. Garagoa means in Muysccubun "behind the hill" or "on the other side of the hill".

== Description ==
Adult males measure 22–26 mm (0.9–1.0 in) and adult females 27–31 mm (1.1–1.2 in) in snout–vent length. The head is large and wide. The snout is rounded in profile but blunt and barely rounded in dorsal view. The tympanic annulus is indistinct; the weakly-developed supratympanic fold hides the upper part of the tympanum. The fingers are long, partly webbed, and have rounded discs. The toes are relatively long and webbed. The upper surfaces of the head and body are brown; the flanks are dark brown with bluish-white spots. There are conspicuous yellowish-greenish white dorsolateral and labial bands. The ventral surfaces are dull brown. The iris is copper or occasionally gold.

Gosner stage 40 tadpoles measure about 46 mm (1.8 in) in total length, of which the body makes about one third.

== Habitat and conservation ==
Dendropsophus garagoensis occurs and reproduces in shrubs found in flooded pastures, marshes, and temporary pools at elevations of 2,000–2,570 m (6,560–8,430 ft) above sea level. Males typically call perched on Juncus some 20–50 cm (7.9–19.7 in) above the water.

This species appears to tolerate some habitat modification and is unlikely to be facing substantial threats. It is abundant and its population is believed to be stable. It is not known from protected areas.
