= Neira, Caldas =

- Municipality and town
- Flag Coat of arms

- Location of the municipality and town of Neira, Caldas in the Caldas Department of Colombia.

- Location in Colombia
- Coordinates: 5°9′59″N 75°31′8″W
- Country: Colombia
- Department: Caldas Department
- Elevation: 1,969 m (6,460 ft)

Population (Census 2018)
  - Total: 20,495
- Time zone: UTC-5 (Colombia Standard Time)

Neira is a town and municipality in the Colombian Department of Caldas. Located along the Colombian coffee growing axis, it was named part of the "Coffee Cultural Landscape" UNESCO World Heritage Site in 2011.
