= Termotasajero II =

The Termotasajero II is a 161.6-megawatt (net) coal-fired power plant in San Cayetano, Cúcuta, Norte de Santander, Colombia.

Termotasajero II Coal Thermal Power Generation Plant Project in Colombia completed synchronization on November 2, 2015.

Conducted as a preparation to full-scale commercial operation, synchronization is a series of processes to link the power generated on the field to the power grid to supply it to households and industrial fields. TT2 Project will be fully up and running after several phases of trial operation, including an increased output test and a performance guarantee test designed to ensure safety and reliability.

The plant damage, February 2, 2016 follows a month-long outage at the recently inaugurated Termotasajero 2 coal-fired unit. The 160 MW plant came back online on 15 March 2016, after six out of 18 transformers were damaged during maintenance.

== See also ==
- List of power stations in Colombia
