= Ituango Dam =

Dam in Colombia

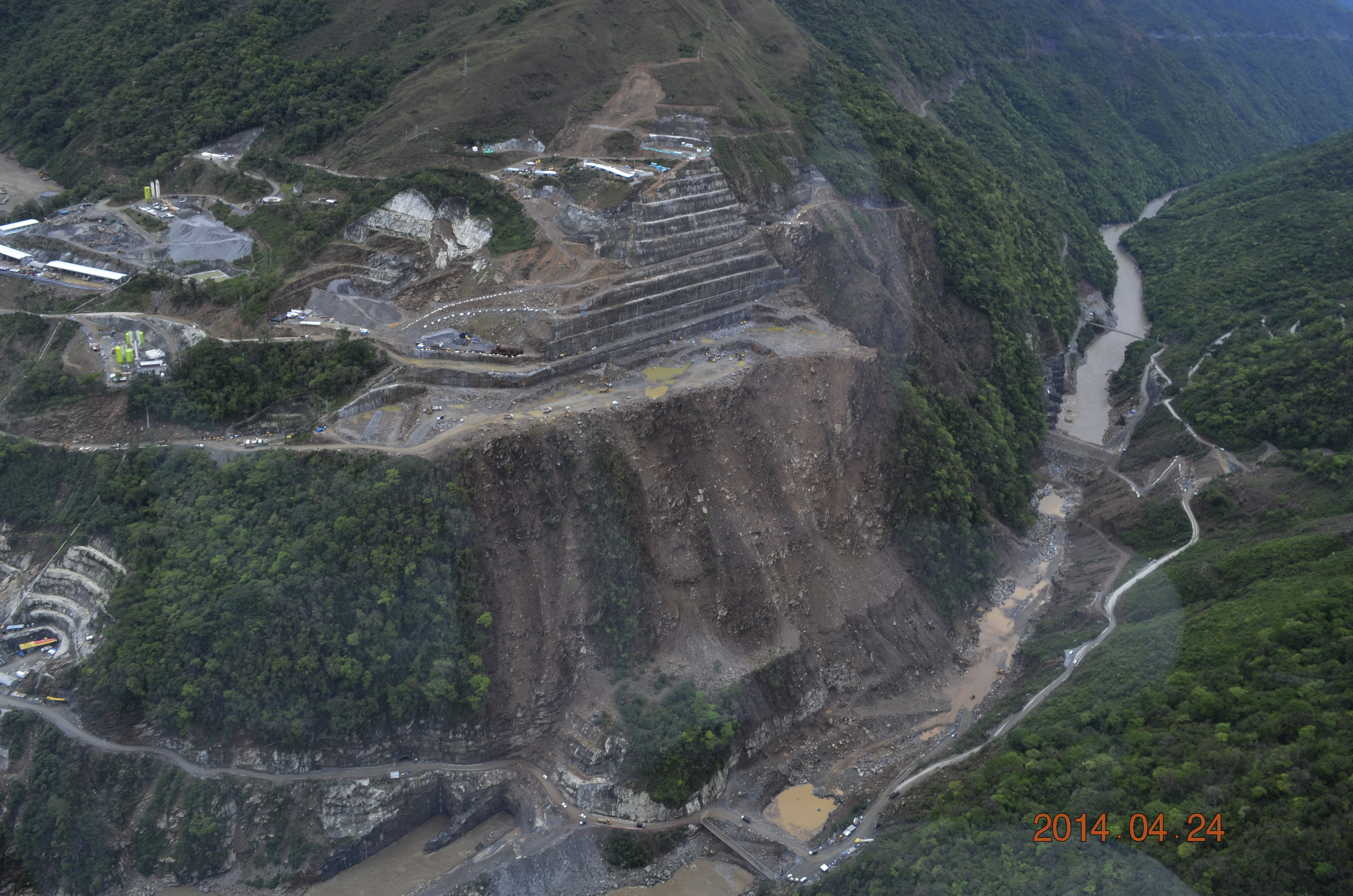
- Construction site in 2014

- Location within Colombia
- Official name: Pescadero-Ituango "José Tejada Sáenz"
- Country: Colombia
- Location: Ituango
- Coordinates: 7°07′50.04″N 75°39′48.7″W
- Status: Under construction
- Construction began: 2011
- Opening date: 2022 (2 turbines)
- Construction cost: US$3.8 billion

Dam and spillways
- Type of dam: Embankment; earth-fill clay core
- Impounds: Cauca River
- Height: 225 m (738 ft)
- Dam volume: 19,000,000 m^{3} (670,000,000 cu ft)
- Spillway type: Service, gate controlled
- Spillway capacity: 22,600 m^{3}/s (800,000 cu ft/s)

Reservoir
- Total capacity: 2,720,000,000 m^{3} (2,210,000 acre⋅ft)
- Active capacity: 980,000,000 m^{3} (790,000 acre⋅ft)
- Surface area: 38 km^{2} (15 sq mi)
- Maximum length: 127 km (79 mi)

Power Station
- Operator: EPM Ituango
- Hydraulic head: 197 m (646 ft) (nominal)
- Turbines: 8 x 307 MW (412,000 hp) Francis type
- Installed capacity: 2,456 MW (3,294,000 hp) (planned) (1,200 MW (1,600,000 hp) operating as of 2025)
- Annual generation: 9,200 GWh (33,000 TJ) (firm)
- Website hidroituango.com.co/es

The Ituango Dam, also referred to as the Pescadero-Ituango Dam or Hidroituango, is an embankment dam under construction on the Cauca River near Ituango in Antioquia Department, Colombia. The primary purpose of the project is hydroelectric power generation, and its power plant will have an installed capacity of 2,456 megawatts (3,294,000 hp) if completed. Preliminary construction on the dam began in September 2011, and the plant was expected to begin operations in late 2018. Heavy rainfall and landslides in April–May 2018 blocked the river's diversion tunnel, threatening a breach of the dam. If completed, Ituango will be the largest power station in Colombia. Two turbines went online on 30 November 2022, and the other two have been operational since 31 October 2023.

== Background ==
The development of the Ituango Dam project was proposed by EPM Ituango, a consortium of Empresas Públicas de Medellín (EPM) and the Antioquia government. The dam's feasibility study was completed in 1983, but the project was shelved in the 1990s due to an economic crisis. The final designs for the project were finished in 2008, and on 8 July 2011, the project management contract was awarded. Preliminary construction (surveying, roads, bridges, diversion tunnels) began in September 2011, with the expected completion date forecasted for 2013. Main works started thereafter, and the power plant was expected to be commissioned in 2018. The total cost is expected to be US$2.8 billion.

== Design ==
The dam is planned to be a 225-metre-tall (738 ft) earth-fill embankment type with a clay core, with a volume of 19 million cubic metres (670×10^{6} cu ft). Its reservoir will have a capacity of 2,720 million cubic metres (2,210,000 acre⋅ft), of which 980 million cubic metres (790,000 acre⋅ft) will be active (or "useful") capacity. The reservoir will be 127 kilometres (79 mi) long and cover an area of 38 square kilometres (15 sq mi). To maintain reservoir levels, the dam will have a spillway controlled by four radial gates with a design flow of 22,600 cubic metres per second (800,000 cu ft/s). The dam's power plant will have a nominal hydraulic head of 197 metres (646 ft) and contain eight 307-megawatt (412,000 hp) Francis turbine-generators.

== Diversion tunnel blockage ==
Three tunnels were constructed to divert the Cauca River around the construction site. Two were eventually sealed during construction, leaving a third to divert the river. Between 28 April and 7 May 2018, three landslides blocked the tunnel, leading the reservoir to fill. Engineers attempted to open the two closed tunnels with explosives but were unsuccessful. On 10 May, when the reservoir reached the power-station intake, engineers began releasing water through the unfinished powerhouse to prevent a breach of the dam. On 12 May, one of the previously sealed tunnels naturally reopened, which suddenly increased downstream flows by three times the average. This prompted evacuations downstream, eventually totaling around 25,000 people.

On 16 May, silt buildup in a portion of the powerhouse, the only means to drain the reservoir, led to water escaping into a transit gallery used by construction vehicles. The water eventually poured onto the downstream face of the dam, eroding the roadway and a portion of the riprap. Subsequently, EPM announced that a risk of collapse existed, and workers continued to fill the dam to its design height in hopes that the spillway could be used to prevent an over-topping of the dam. Heavy rainfall was expected in the Cauca River basin through the end of May.

On 19 May, the dam works reached an elevation of 405 m, 5 m below the cofferdam's target level. On 25 May, the Colombian Society of Engineers issued a letter expressing their panic about the situation, stating that the "Ituango project is dead and there is no control over it, so the most natural thing is to expect it to fail; we are sure that it is easier to fail than not to fail, and we are truly in a panic".

== Environmental impact ==
Some sources have argued that the dam construction has severe ecological consequences, and displaced families, environmentalists, youth groups, and concerned locals have opposed the project. Other publications have argued that the project will benefit millions through extra revenue towards social and infrastructure programs.

In February 2019, the project came under increased pressure from local and national governmental regulatory agencies because of the closure of the river flow and the downstream environmental and economic impact. Moreover, studies from the National University of Colombia have shown that a dam failure is likely unless an emergency plan is adopted. The safety of the downstream communities has been highlighted as being critical. By November 2022, drills had evacuated 5,000 people to prepare for the operation of the dam.

== See also ==
- List of power stations in Colombia
