= San Luis de Gaceno =

- Municipality and town
- Flag

- Location of the municipality and town of San Luis de Gaceno in the Boyacá Department of Colombia
- Coordinates: 4°49′12.59″N 73°10′6.30″W
- Country: Colombia
- Department: Boyacá Department
- Province: Neira Province

Government
  - Mayor: Juan Carlos Buitrago Salgado (2020-2023)
- Elevation: 395 m (1,296 ft)

Population (2018)
  - Total: 5,919
- Time zone: UTC-5 (Colombia Standard Time)
- Website: https://www.sanluisdegaceno-boyaca.gov.co/

San Luis de Gaceno (Spanish pronunciation: [san lwis ðe ɣaˈseno]) is a town and municipality in Boyacá Department, Colombia, part of the subregion of the Neira Province.
