= San Carlos, Antioquia =

Coordinates: 6.18972°N 74.9969°W

- Municipality and town
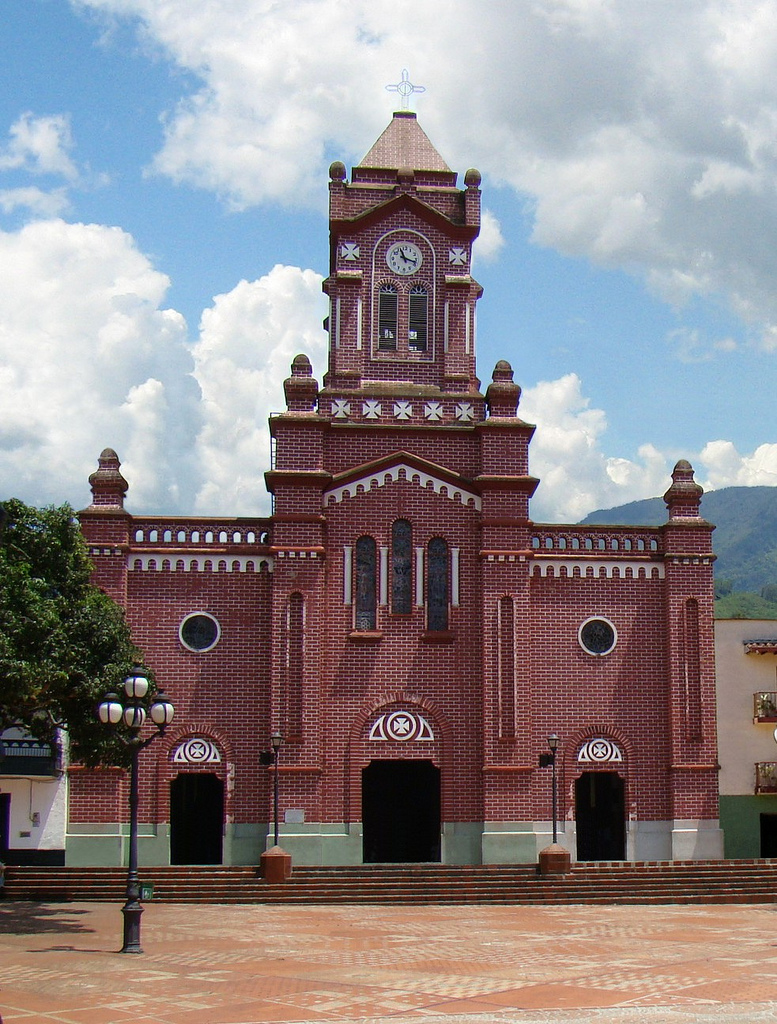

- Flag Coat of arms

- Location of the municipality and town of San Carlos in the Antioquia Department of Colombia
- Country: Colombia
- Department: Antioquia Department
- Subregion: Eastern

Area
  - Total: 702 km^{2} (271 sq mi)

Population (Census 2018)
  - Total: 14,480
  - Density: 20.6/km^{2} (53.4/sq mi)
- Time zone: UTC-5 (Colombia Standard Time)

San Carlos is a town and municipality in the Colombian department of Antioquia, part of the subregion of Eastern Antioquia. It is called the hydro-electrical capital of Colombia, because it has many dams and it produces much energy. The population was 14,480 at the 2018 census.

== History ==
The site of the town was discovered by Captain Francisco Nuñez Pedroso. The town was founded on 14 August 1786.

== Geography ==
The municipal area is 702 km². It has three corregimientos, El Jordán, Puerto Garzas and Samaná del Norte.

San Carlos is three hours away from the departmental capital, Medellín. The two are linked by a road.

== Economy ==
- Tourism - one of the more important economic enterprises for the municipality
- Energy production with dams
- Wood exploitation

== Sites of interest ==
- Dams such as the Punchiná Dam
- Waterfalls - an ecological path about 20 minutes from the central park has two beautiful waterfalls, the river making natural pools
- Landscape
- Fishing

== Climate ==
Climate data for San Carlos, elevation 1,113 m (3,652 ft), (1981–2010)
Month	Jan	Feb	Mar	Apr	May	Jun	Jul	Aug	Sep	Oct	Nov	Dec	Year
Mean daily maximum °C (°F)	26.9 (80.4)	27.3 (81.1)	27.5 (81.5)	27.6 (81.7)	28.1 (82.6)	28.6 (83.5)	28.8 (83.8)	28.9 (84.0)	28.4 (83.1)	27.4 (81.3)	26.6 (79.9)	26.6 (79.9)	27.8 (82.0)
Daily mean °C (°F)	22.0 (71.6)	22.3 (72.1)	22.4 (72.3)	22.6 (72.7)	23.0 (73.4)	23.1 (73.6)	23.0 (73.4)	23.1 (73.6)	22.7 (72.9)	22.2 (72.0)	21.8 (71.2)	22.0 (71.6)	22.5 (72.5)
Mean daily minimum °C (°F)	17.6 (63.7)	17.8 (64.0)	17.7 (63.9)	17.9 (64.2)	17.9 (64.2)	17.5 (63.5)	17.2 (63.0)	17.0 (62.6)	17.1 (62.8)	17.2 (63.0)	17.4 (63.3)	17.4 (63.3)	17.5 (63.5)
Average precipitation mm (inches)	185.7 (7.31)	193.0 (7.60)	318.6 (12.54)	468.3 (18.44)	454.5 (17.89)	312.0 (12.28)	298.2 (11.74)	382.9 (15.07)	449.0 (17.68)	588.5 (23.17)	458.9 (18.07)	284.1 (11.19)	4,292.4 (168.99)
Average precipitation days (≥ 1.0 mm)	16	15	20	24	25	20	19	21	24	26	25	21	250
Average relative humidity (%)	86	85	85	86	85	82	80	80	84	86	88	88	85
Mean monthly sunshine hours	133.3	118.6	108.5	105.0	139.5	159.0	198.4	192.2	150.0	127.1	108.0	120.9	1,660.5
Mean daily sunshine hours	4.3	4.2	3.5	3.5	4.5	5.3	6.4	6.2	5.0	4.1	3.6	3.9	4.5
Source: Instituto de Hidrologia Meteorologia y Estudios Ambientales
