= Sogamoso River =

Coordinates: 7.2060°N 73.9215°W

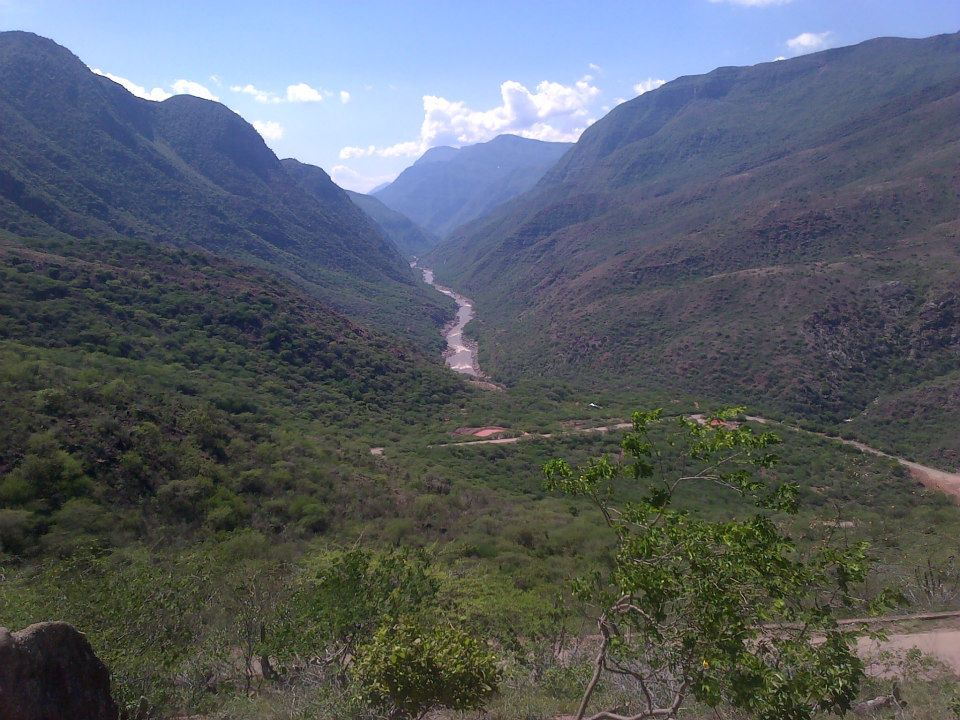

Location
- Country: Colombia

Physical characteristics
- Mouth
  - location: Magdalena River → Caribbean Sea

Sogamoso River (Spanish pronunciation: [soɣaˈmoso]) is a river of northern Colombia. It flows into the Magdalena River and on to the Caribbean Sea. The Sogamoso Dam on the river near Bucaramanga was completed in 2014.

== Course ==
The Sogamoso River is a river in northern Colombia, which is formed by the confluence of the Suárez River and the Chicamocha River after crossing the Chicamocha Canyon, and flows into the Magdalena River between Puerto Wilches and Barrancabermeja, and this in turn empties into the Caribbean Sea.

== See also ==
- List of rivers of Colombia
