= Belalcázar, Caldas =

Belalcázar
- Municipality and town
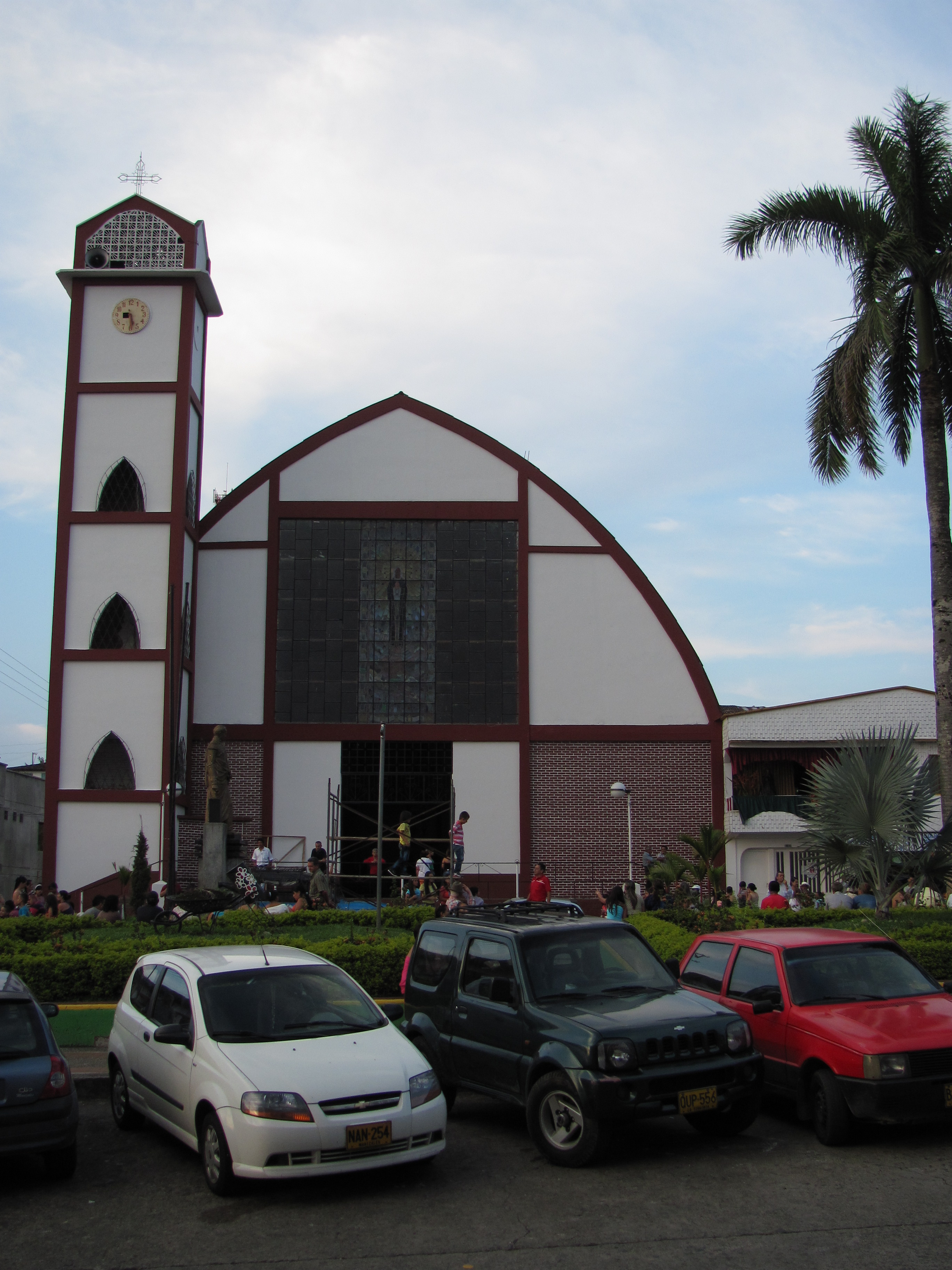

- Flag

- Location of the municipality and town of Belalcázar, Caldas in the Caldas Department of Colombia.

- Location in Colombia
- Coordinates: 5°0′0″N 75°49′59″W
- Country: Colombia
- Department: Caldas Department
- Established: 1888

Area
  - Total: 105 km^{2} (41 sq mi)
- Elevation: 1,632 m (5,354 ft)

Population (Census 2018)
  - Total: 9,690
  - Density: 92.3/km^{2} (239/sq mi)
- Time zone: UTC-5 (Colombia Standard Time)
- Website: Official website

Belalcázar (Spanish pronunciation: [belalˈkasaɾ]) is a town and municipality in the Colombian Department of Caldas.
