= La Merced, Caldas =

- Municipality and town
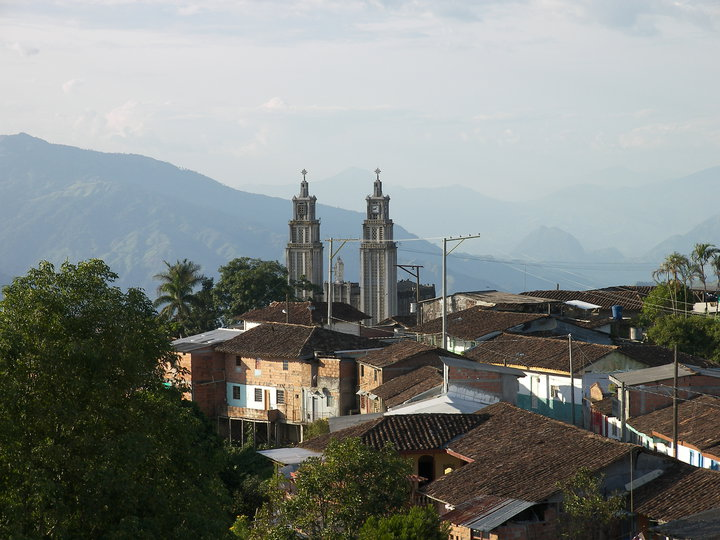

- Flag Coat of arms

- Location of the municipality and town of La Merced, Caldas in the Caldas Department of Colombia.

- Location in Colombia
- Coordinates: 5°23′58″N 75°32′39″W
- Country: Colombia
- Department: Caldas Department

Government
  - Alcalde (Mayor): Rubén Darío Castaño
- Elevation: 1,819 m (5,968 ft)
- Time zone: UTC-5 (Colombia Standard Time)

La Merced (Spanish pronunciation: [la meɾˈseð]) is a town and municipality in the Colombian Department of Caldas.
