= Neira Province =

Neira Province Provincia de Neira
- Province
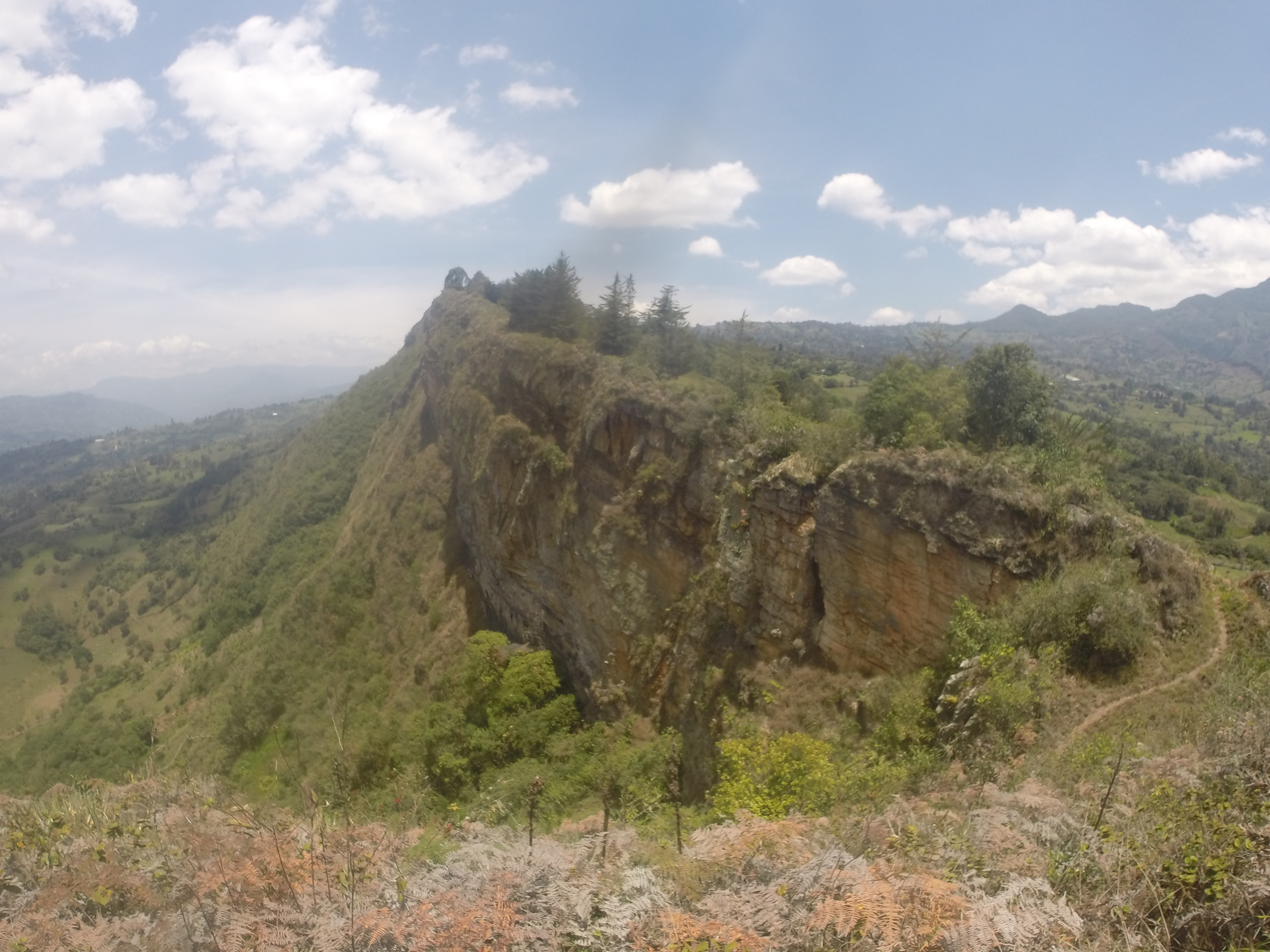
- Hill in Pachavita
- Etymology: Juan Nepomuceno Neira
- Location of Neira Province in Colombia
- Coordinates: 5°05′00″N 73°22′00″W
- Country: Colombia
- Department: Boyacá
- Capital: Garagoa
- Municipalities: 6
- Time zone: UTC−5 (COT)
- Indigenous groups: Muisca; Tegua

The Neira Province is a subregion of the Colombian Department of Boyacá. The subregion is formed by 6 municipalities. The province is named after Juan Nepomuceno Neira.

== Municipalities ==
Chinavita • Garagoa • Macanal • Pachavita • San Luis de Gaceno • Santa María
