= Viterbo, Caldas =

- Municipality and town
- Flag Coat of arms

- Location of the municipality and town of Viterbo, Caldas in the Caldas Department of Colombia.

- Location in Colombia
- Coordinates: 5°3′38″N 75°52′24″W
- Country: Colombia
- Department: Caldas Department

Area
  - Total: 172 km^{2} (66 sq mi)
- Elevation: 998 m (3,274 ft)

Population (Census 2018)
  - Total: 12,432
  - Density: 72.3/km^{2} (187/sq mi)
- Time zone: UTC-5 (Colombia Standard Time)

Viterbo is a town and municipality in the Colombian Department of Caldas. Officially established as a municipality on December 31, 1951, it was originally founded on April 19, 1911, by Presbítero Nazario Restrepo Botero. The current mayor is Nestor Javier Ospina Garjales. The town is referred to as "El Paraiso Turistico de Caldas" (The Tourist Paradise of the Colombian Department of Caldas). This nickname reflects its warm year-round climate, the presence of villas, farms, and condominiums in the surrounding area, and the hospitality of its residents, known as 'Viterbeños'.

== Location ==
Viterbo is located between the Risaralda River Valley and the foothills of the Cordillera Occidental. It is proximity to Pereira and three other major cities: Manizales, Cali and Medellín. These cities are linked by well-developed, easily accessible roads. The town also benefits from nearby international airports, including Matecaña International Airport in Pereira and Santa Ana International Airport near Cartago. Additionally, it is celebrated as "El Paraíso de Caldas" (the paradise of Caldas), thanks to its stunning landscape, upscale condominiums, spacious streets, and abundant recreational facilities.

== Local Economy ==
The local economy of Viterbo primarily revolves around agriculture and farming, with key exports such as sugarcane, corn, citrus fruits, tropical produce, and coffee. Additionally, a burgeoning tourism sector has developed, driven by the growth in vacation condominium construction.
