= Santa María, Boyacá =

- Municipality and town
- Flag

- Location of the municipality and town of Santa María in the Boyacá Department of Colombia
- Coordinates: 4°51′36″N 73°15′46″W
- Country: Colombia
- Department: Boyacá Department
- Province: Neira Province

Government
  - Mayor: Pablo Antonio Bernal Sánchez (2020-2023)
- Time zone: UTC-5 (Colombia Standard Time)

Santa María is a town and municipality in the Colombian Department of Boyacá, part of the subregion of the Neira Province.

== Climate ==
Santa María has a tropical monsoon climate (Am) with moderate to heavy rainfall from November to March and heavy to extremely heavy rainfall from April to October. It is the second wettest place in the department of Boyacá.

Climate data for Santa María
Month	Jan	Feb	Mar	Apr	May	Jun	Jul	Aug	Sep	Oct	Nov	Dec	Year
Average rainfall mm (inches)	54.5 (2.15)	105.0 (4.13)	189.3 (7.45)	456.1 (17.96)	631.4 (24.86)	693.0 (27.28)	628.0 (24.72)	542.3 (21.35)	431.8 (17.00)	423.5 (16.67)	317.5 (12.50)	171.2 (6.74)	4,643.6 (182.81)
Average rainy days	9	10	15	23	28	28	28	27	23	23	21	16	251
Source: IDEAM
