= Garagoa =

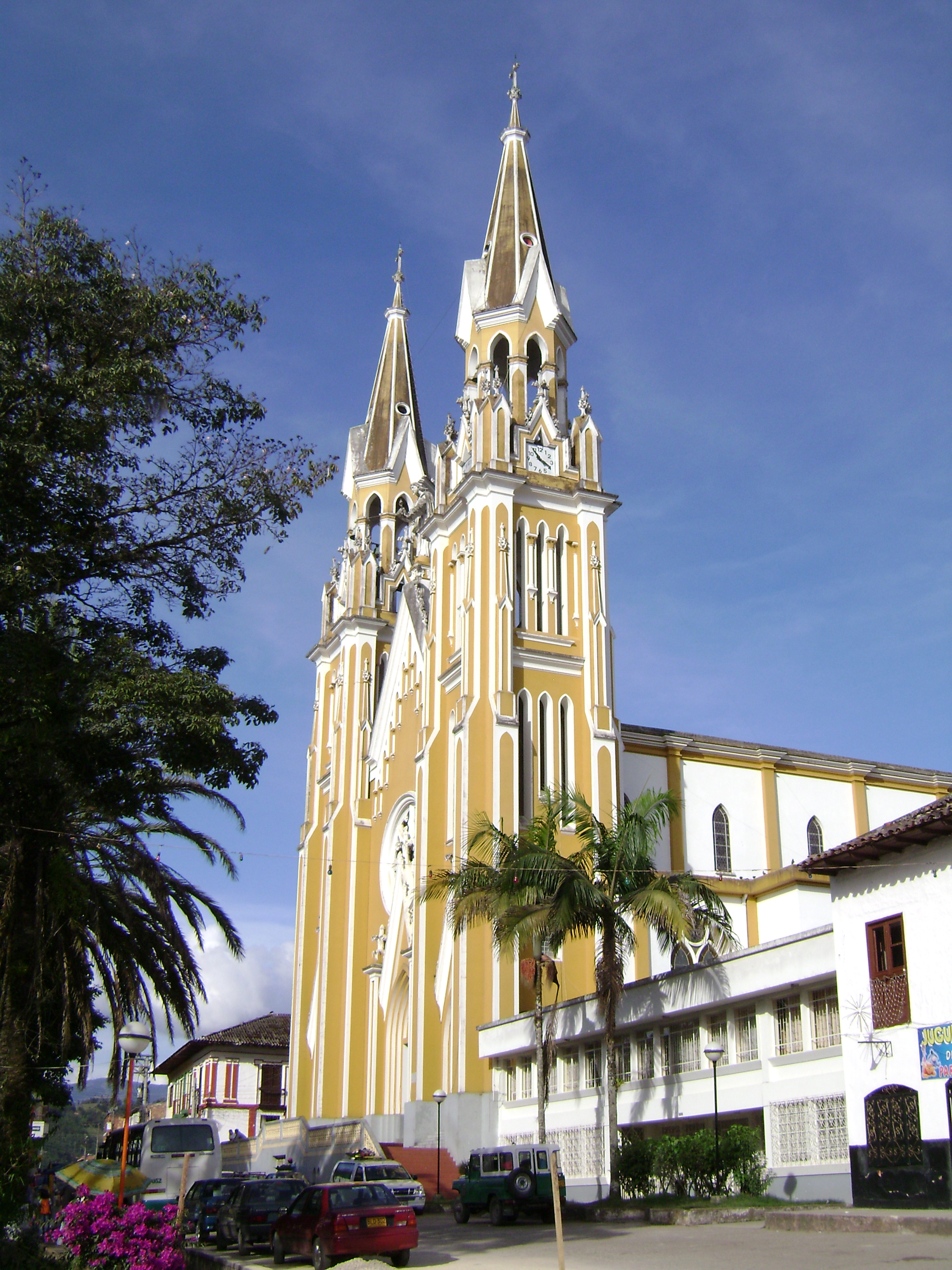
- Church of Garagoa

- Flag Coat of arms

- Location of the town and municipality of Garagoa in Boyacá Department
- Coordinates: 5°04′57″N 73°21′51″W
- Country: Colombia
- Department: Boyacá
- Province: Neira
- Founded: 5 October 1809

Government
  - Mayor: Fabio Augusto Arévalo (2020–2023)

Area
  - City: 191.75 km^{2} (74.04 sq mi)
- Elevation: 1,650 m (5,410 ft)

Population (2015)
  - City: 16,944
  - Density: 88.365/km^{2} (228.86/sq mi)
  - Urban: 13,654
- Time zone: -5
- Website: Official website

Garagoa (Spanish pronunciation: [ɡaɾaˈɣoa]) is a town and municipality in Colombia, located in the Boyacá Department. It covers an area of 191.75 km^{2} and the urban centre is located at an altitude of 1,650 metres (5,410 ft) above sea level. Parts of the municipality reach altitudes of 3,050 metres (10,010 ft). It is the capital of the province of Neira. It is also the seat of the Diocese of Garagoa of the Catholic Church. The municipality is situated in the Eastern Ranges of the Colombian Andes and borders Chinavita in the north, Macanal in the south, Tenza and Sutatenza in the west and Miraflores and Chinavita in the east.

== Etymology ==
Garagoa in Chibcha means "Behind the hill" or "On the other side of the hill".

== History ==
In the times before the Spanish conquest, the area of Garagoa was inhabited by the Muisca, organized in their loose Muisca Confederation. Garagoa was ruled by the zaque based in Hunza. Garagoa was visited by conquistador Gonzalo Jimenez de Quesada in 1539, and was elevated to municipal status on October 5, 1809.

== Economy ==
Main economical activities of Garagoa are agriculture, livestock farming and mining. Among the agricultural products, most important are maize, yuca, potatoes, arracacha, bananas, peas, beans, pumpkins, tomatoes, fique, coffee and sugar cane. Also mangoes, chirimoya, oranges, avocadoes, pineapples, mandarines, papayas, maracuyá and guayaba are produced. Mining is mostly coal.

== Trivia ==
- The tree frog Dendropsophus garagoensis has been found in and named after Garagoa

== Gallery ==
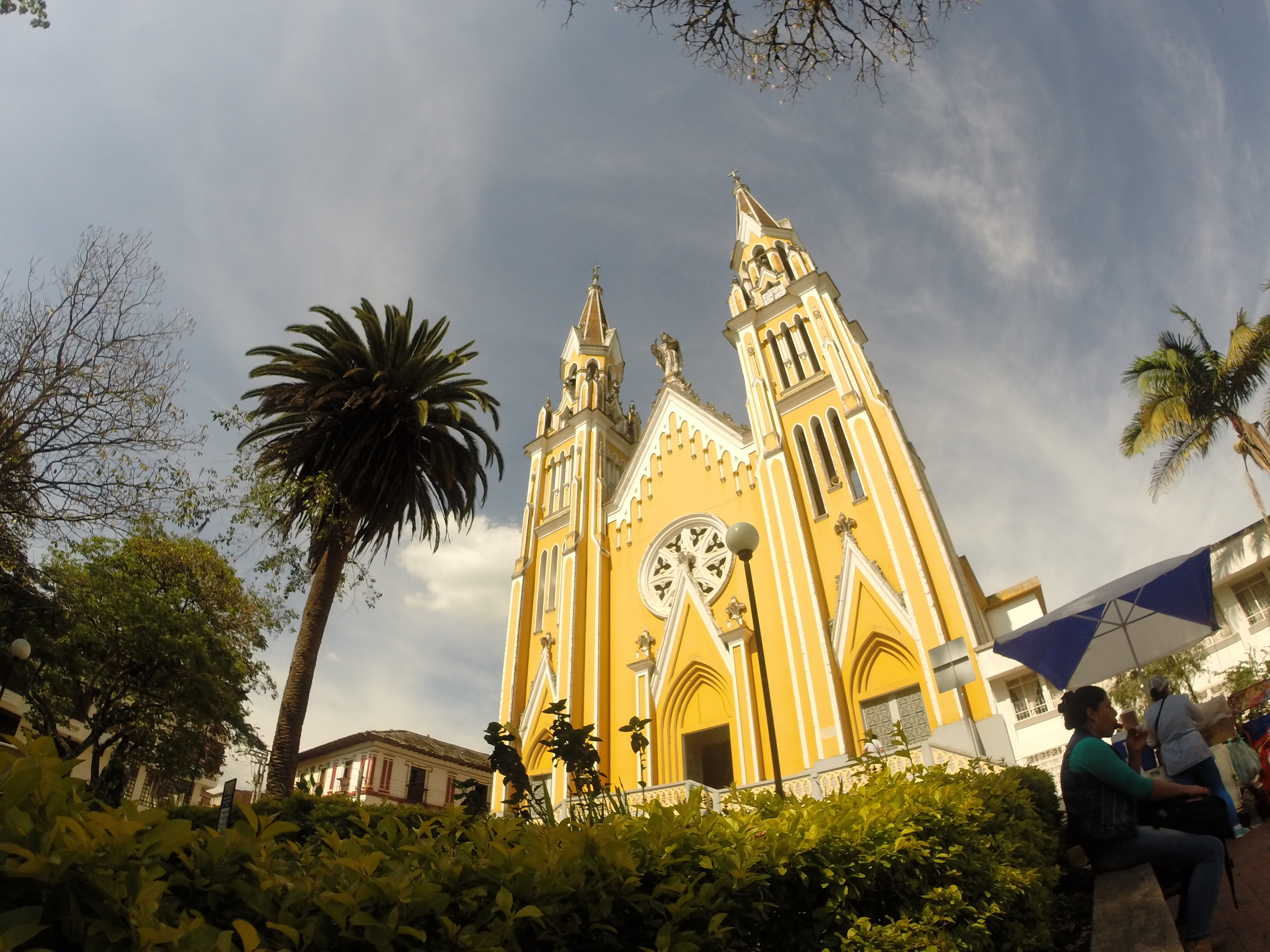
Church of Garagoa

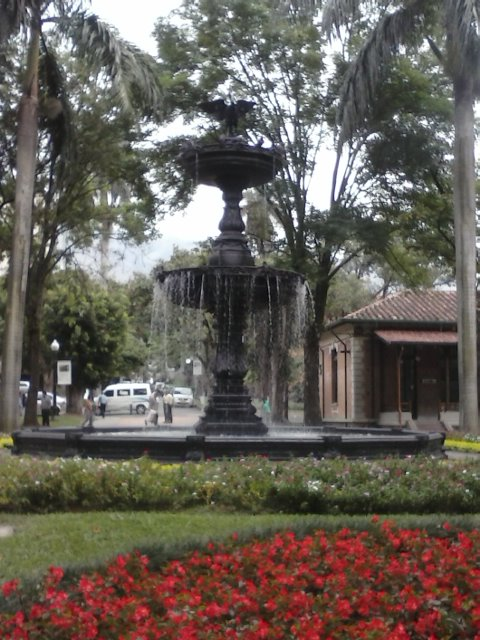
Fountain

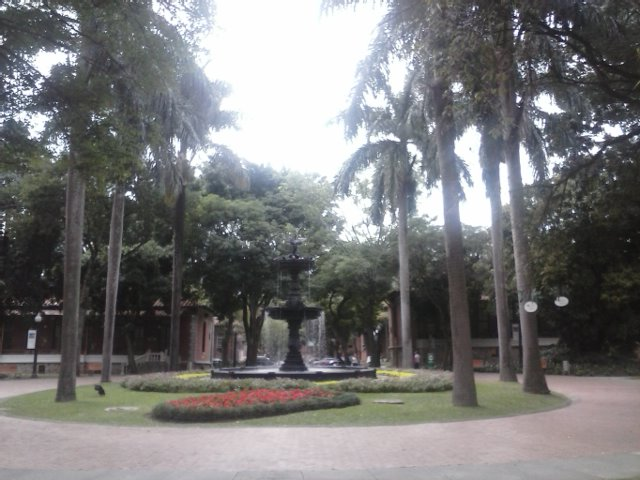
Central park and square

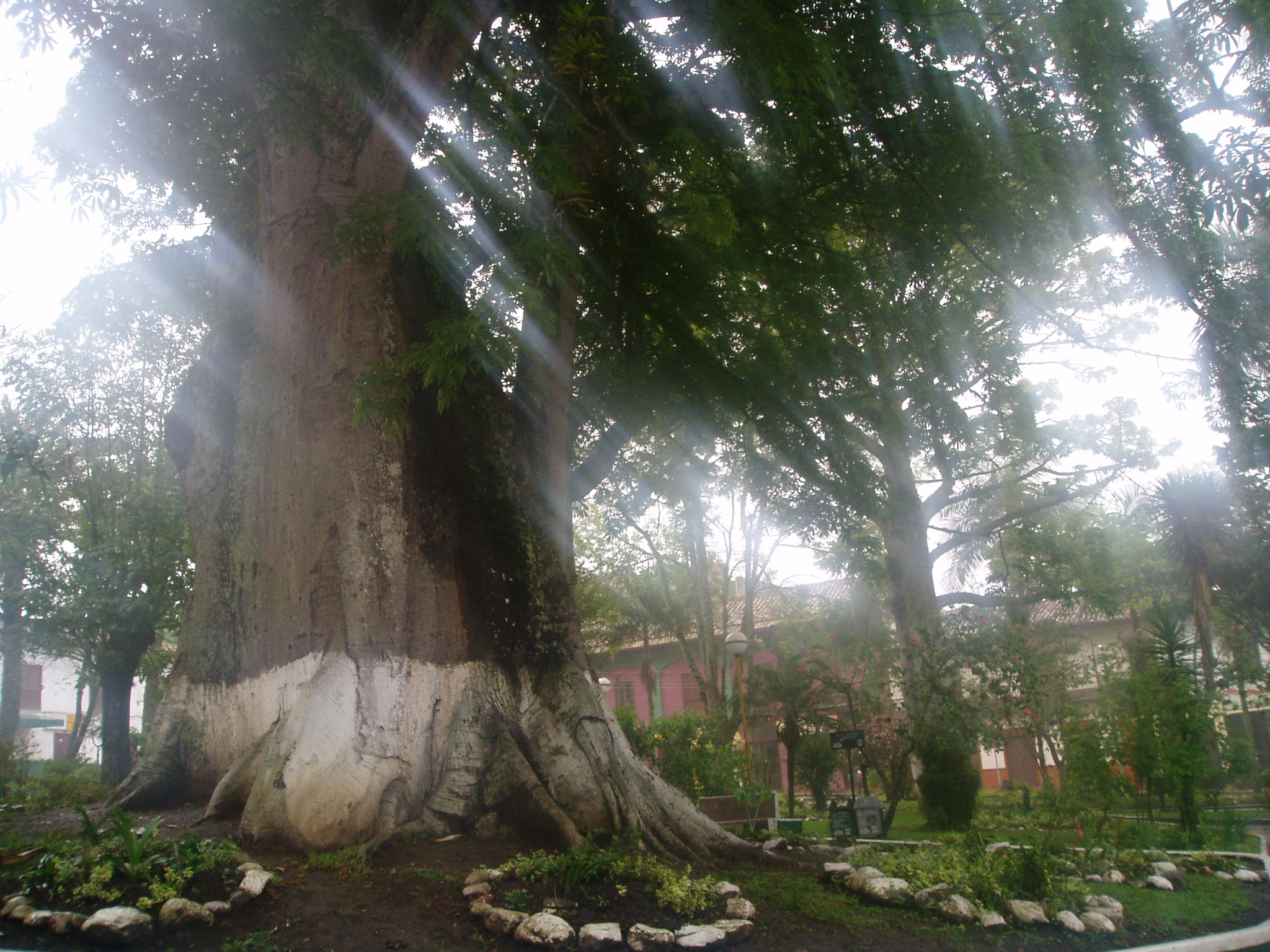
Tree in central park

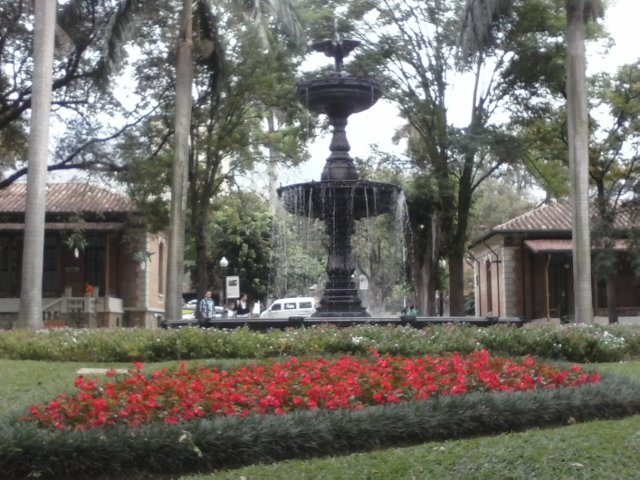
Central park
