= Sogamoso Dam =

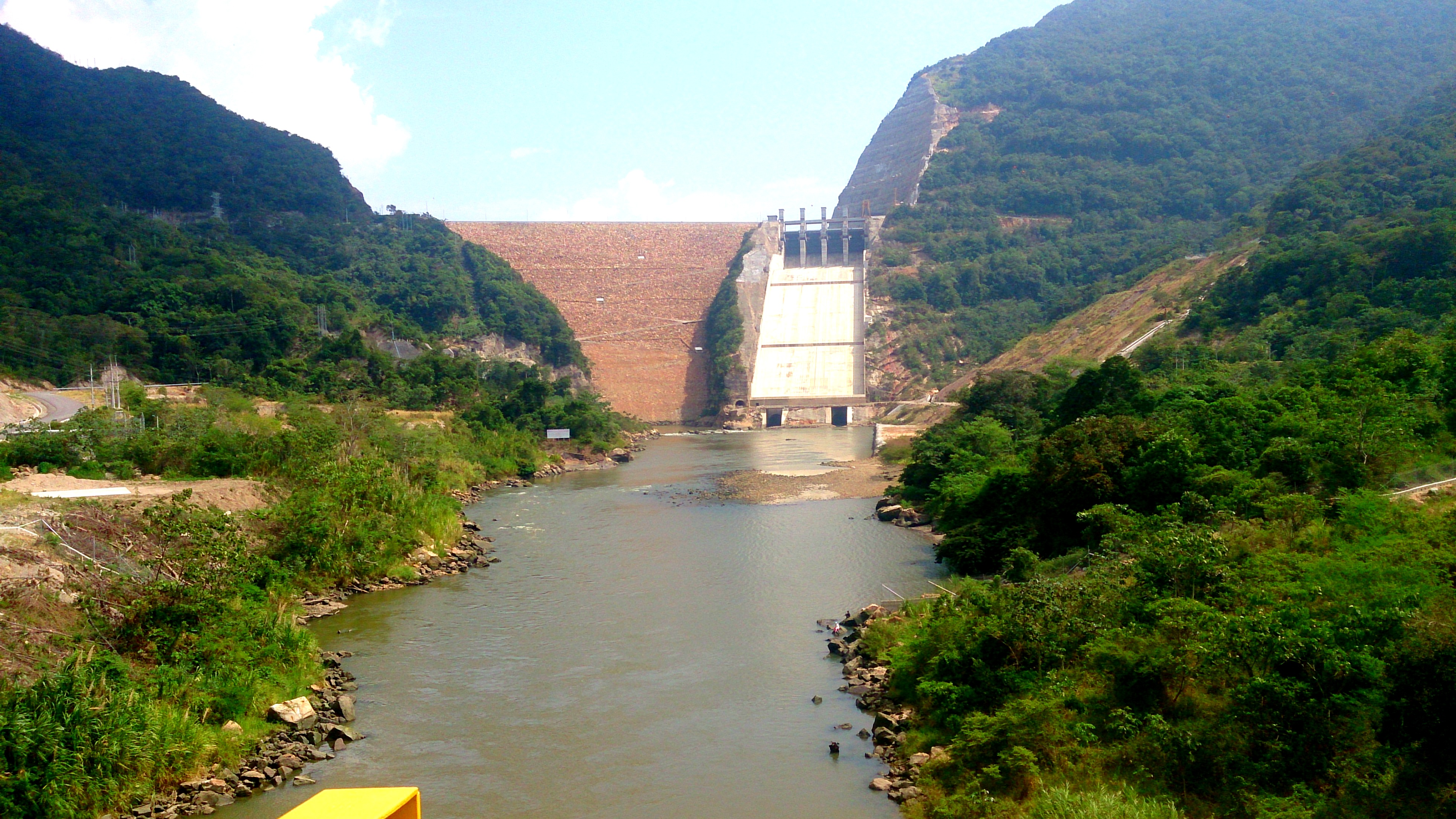
- Picture of the dam

- Location within Colombia
- Official name: Presa Sogamoso
- Country: Colombia
- Location: Bucaramanga
- Coordinates: 7°6′3″N 73°24′24″W
- Status: Operational
- Construction began: February 2009
- Opening date: December 2014
- Construction cost: US$1.74 billion
- Owner: ISAGEN S.A.

Dam and spillways
- Type of dam: Embankment, concrete-face rock-fill
- Impounds: Sogamoso River
- Height: 190 m (620 ft)
- Length: 345 m (1,132 ft)
- Width (crest): 9 m (30 ft)
- Spillway type: Controlled chute, four radial gates
- Spillway capacity: 17,100 m^{3}/s (600,000 cu ft/s)

Reservoir
- Total capacity: 4,800×10^{6} m^{3} (3,900,000 acre⋅ft)
- Surface area: 7,000 ha (17,000 acres)

Power Station
- Commission date: December 2014
- Type: Conventional
- Turbines: 3 x 273 MW (366,000 hp) Francis-type
- Installed capacity: 820 MW (1,100,000 hp) (max. planned)
- Annual generation: 5,056 GWh (18,200 TJ) est.

The Sogamoso Dam is a concrete-face rock-fill dam on the Sogamoso River in northern Colombia. It is located 30 kilometres (19 mi) west of Bucaramanga in Santander Department and 285 kilometres (177 mi) north of Bogotá. The primary purpose of the dam is hydroelectric power generation and its power plant has an installed capacity of 820 megawatts (1,100,000 hp) which increased Colombia's generating capacity by 10 percent. Construction on the dam began in February 2009 and its first 273 MW Francis turbine-generator was commissioned on 1 December 2014. The other two generators were operational by 20 December 2014. The US$1.74 billion dam and power plant is owned by ISAGEN. INGETEC designed the dam in the 1990s and Impreglio was awarded the contract for construction.

The dam is 190 metres (620 ft) tall and withholds a 4,800 million cubic metres (3,900,000 acre⋅ft) reservoir. The power plant houses four 273 megawatts (366,000 hp) Francis turbine-generators. Its spillway is located on its left bank and controlled by four radial gates. It has a maximum discharge of 17,100 cubic metres per second (600,000 cu ft/s). The dam has been the subject of protests among locals as it relocated 160 families and negatively impact the livelihood of miners within the reservoir zone and fishers downstream. Relocation of the residents, construction of a new bridges and roads will cost US$202 million. A 100-metre (330 ft) wide protected area was established around the reservoir.

== See also ==
- List of tallest dams in the world
- List of power stations in Colombia
