= Risaralda, Caldas =

- Municipality and town
- Flag Coat of arms

- Location of the municipality and town of Risaralda, Caldas in the Caldas Department of Colombia.

- Location in Colombia
- Coordinates: 5°9′50″N 75°46′2″W
- Country: Colombia
- Department: Caldas Department
- Elevation: 1,743 m (5,719 ft)
- Time zone: UTC-5 (Colombia Standard Time)

Risaralda is a town and municipality in the Colombian Department of Caldas.
