= Supía, Caldas =

- Municipality and town
- Flag Coat of arms

- Location of the municipality and town of Supía, Caldas in the Caldas Department of Colombia.

- Location in Colombia
- Coordinates: 5°27′2″N 75°39′5″W
- Country: Colombia
- Department: Caldas Department
- Elevation: 1,183 m (3,881 ft)

Population (Census 2018)
  - Total: 26,571
- Time zone: UTC-5 (Colombia Standard Time)

Supía is a town and municipality in the Colombian Department of Caldas. Located along the Colombian coffee growing axis, it was part of the "Coffee Cultural Landscape" UNESCO World Heritage Site in 2011.

== Climate ==
Climate data for Supía (Rafael Escobar), elevation 1,320 m (4,330 ft), (1981–2010)
Month	Jan	Feb	Mar	Apr	May	Jun	Jul	Aug	Sep	Oct	Nov	Dec	Year
Mean daily maximum °C (°F)	28.2 (82.8)	28.6 (83.5)	28.7 (83.7)	27.7 (81.9)	27.2 (81.0)	27.4 (81.3)	27.8 (82.0)	28.2 (82.8)	27.6 (81.7)	26.4 (79.5)	26.9 (80.4)	27.6 (81.7)	27.7 (81.9)
Daily mean °C (°F)	22.2 (72.0)	22.6 (72.7)	22.7 (72.9)	22.2 (72.0)	21.9 (71.4)	22.1 (71.8)	22.2 (72.0)	22.4 (72.3)	21.8 (71.2)	21.3 (70.3)	21.3 (70.3)	21.8 (71.2)	22.1 (71.8)
Mean daily minimum °C (°F)	17.3 (63.1)	17.6 (63.7)	17.7 (63.9)	17.8 (64.0)	17.7 (63.9)	17.6 (63.7)	17.1 (62.8)	17.3 (63.1)	17.1 (62.8)	17.1 (62.8)	17.3 (63.1)	17.2 (63.0)	17.4 (63.3)
Average precipitation mm (inches)	128.2 (5.05)	110.3 (4.34)	158.7 (6.25)	196.3 (7.73)	209.8 (8.26)	120.1 (4.73)	113.2 (4.46)	125.1 (4.93)	202.5 (7.97)	246.4 (9.70)	240.8 (9.48)	155.4 (6.12)	2,006.6 (79.00)
Average precipitation days	13	12	15	20	21	14	13	15	19	21	21	13	197
Average relative humidity (%)	74	72	72	77	77	76	73	72	71	78	79	77	75
Mean monthly sunshine hours	182.9	163.7	176.7	138.0	151.9	171.0	204.6	195.3	162.0	139.5	144.0	179.8	2,009.4
Mean daily sunshine hours	5.9	5.8	5.7	4.6	4.9	5.7	6.6	6.3	5.4	4.5	4.8	5.8	5.5
Source: Instituto de Hidrologia Meteorologia y Estudios Ambientales
