= Filadelfia, Caldas =

- Municipality and town
- Flag Coat of arms

- Location of the municipality and town of Filadelfia, Caldas in the Caldas Department of Colombia.

- Location in Colombia
- Coordinates: 5°17′46″N 75°33′42″W
- Country: Colombia
- Department: Caldas Department

Area
  - Total: 193 km^{2} (75 sq mi)
- Elevation: 1,550 m (5,090 ft)

Population (Census 2018)
  - Total: 9,630
  - Density: 49.9/km^{2} (129/sq mi)
- Time zone: UTC-5 (Colombia Standard Time)

Filadelfia (Spanish for Philadelphia) is a town and municipality in the Colombian Department of Caldas.
