= Norcasia, Caldas =

- Municipality and town
- A colourful staircase in Norcasia

- Flag Coat of arms

- Location of the municipality and town of Norcasia, Caldas in the Caldas Department of Colombia.

- Location in Colombia
- Coordinates: 5°34′27″N 74°53′20″W
- Country: Colombia
- Department: Caldas Department

Area
  - Total: 211.24 km^{2} (81.56 sq mi)
- Elevation: 700 m (2,300 ft)
- Time zone: UTC-5 (Colombia Standard Time)

Norcasia is a town and municipality in the Colombian Department of Caldas.

== Climate ==
Norcasia has a very wet tropical rainforest climate (Af).

Climate data for Norcasia
Month	Jan	Feb	Mar	Apr	May	Jun	Jul	Aug	Sep	Oct	Nov	Dec	Year
Mean daily maximum °C (°F)	28.6 (83.5)	29.3 (84.7)	28.9 (84.0)	28.6 (83.5)	28.5 (83.3)	28.8 (83.8)	29.5 (85.1)	29.5 (85.1)	28.9 (84.0)	27.8 (82.0)	27.7 (81.9)	27.9 (82.2)	28.7 (83.6)
Daily mean °C (°F)	24.6 (76.3)	25.1 (77.2)	25.0 (77.0)	25.0 (77.0)	24.9 (76.8)	24.8 (76.6)	25.0 (77.0)	25.1 (77.2)	24.8 (76.6)	24.1 (75.4)	24.1 (75.4)	24.2 (75.6)	24.7 (76.5)
Mean daily minimum °C (°F)	20.7 (69.3)	20.9 (69.6)	21.1 (70.0)	21.4 (70.5)	21.3 (70.3)	20.8 (69.4)	20.6 (69.1)	20.7 (69.3)	20.7 (69.3)	20.5 (68.9)	20.6 (69.1)	20.6 (69.1)	20.8 (69.5)
Average rainfall mm (inches)	215.0 (8.46)	241.6 (9.51)	301.3 (11.86)	452.0 (17.80)	397.6 (15.65)	198.5 (7.81)	169.0 (6.65)	255.3 (10.05)	328.0 (12.91)	505.2 (19.89)	485.2 (19.10)	337.7 (13.30)	3,886.4 (152.99)
Average rainy days	9	9	12	14	14	10	9	11	13	16	15	11	143
