= San José, Caldas =

San José
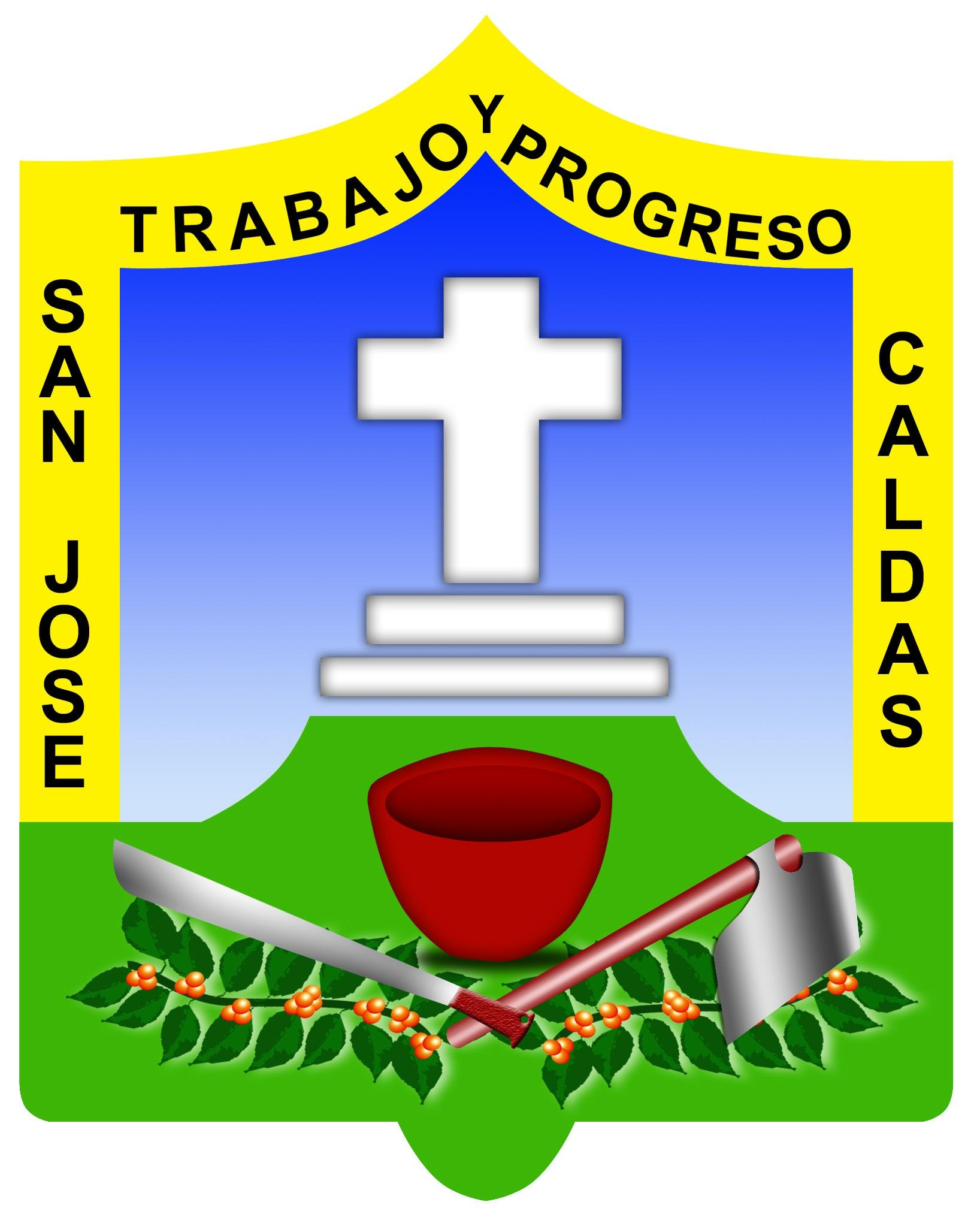
- Flag Coat of arms

- Location of the municipality and town of San José in Caldas Department

- Location in Colombia
- Coordinates: 5°5′24″N 75°47′24″W
- Country: Colombia
- Department: Caldas Department
- Foundation: 1901

Government
  - Mayor: Jorge Andrés Henao Castaño

Area
  - Total: 53.6 km^{2} (20.7 sq mi)
- Elevation: 1,710 m (5,610 ft)

Population
  - Total: 7,480
- Time zone: UTC-5

San José is a town and municipality located in the western portion of the Colombian Department of Caldas. It was originally part of Risaralda Municipality until 1997, when it became an independent municipality within the Caldas Department. The municipality is part of the Lower Western District, 67 km from Manizales. Its name derives from the arrival of the founders on the day of Saint Joseph, March 19.

The municipality is divided into 18 minor counties or veredas: Altomira, La Paz, Los Caimos, El Contento, Tamboral, Arrayanes, El Bosque, Morroazul, La Primavera, La Libertad, La Cienaga, La Estrella, Guaimaral, Vaticano, El Pacifico, La Morelia, Pueblo Rico and Buena Vista.

== Tourism ==
- Alto de la Cruz
- Mount Buenavista
- Monte Contento Changuí
- Mounts of Lopez or the Peace
- Our Lady of Carmen Temple
- Old School of Saint Teresita
- Every two years in October, the town celebrates the Myths and Legends holidays.

== Borders ==
- North: Risaralda
- Northeast and east: Risaralda and Belalcázar
- South: Belalcázar
- West: Viterbo

== Rivers ==
- La Hermosa
- La Mina
- Barcelona
- La Ángela
- Changuí
- La Habana
- El Guamo
