= Samaná Norte River =

Coordinates: 6°12′14″N 74°35′26″W

Samaná Norte

Location
- Country: Colombia

Physical characteristics
- Mouth
  - location: Magdalena River

The Samaná Norte is a river in Antioquia Department, Colombia and a tributary of the Magdalena River.
