= Caldas Department =

Department of Colombia

Department of Caldas Departamento de Caldas
- Department
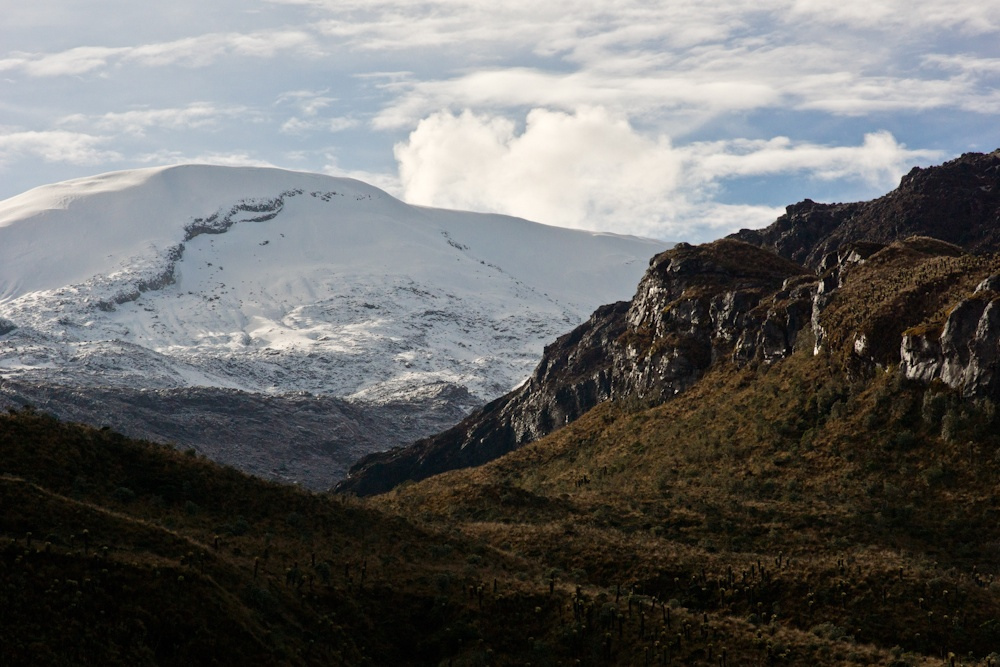
- The Nevado del Ruiz in 2019

- Flag Coat of arms

- Caldas shown in red

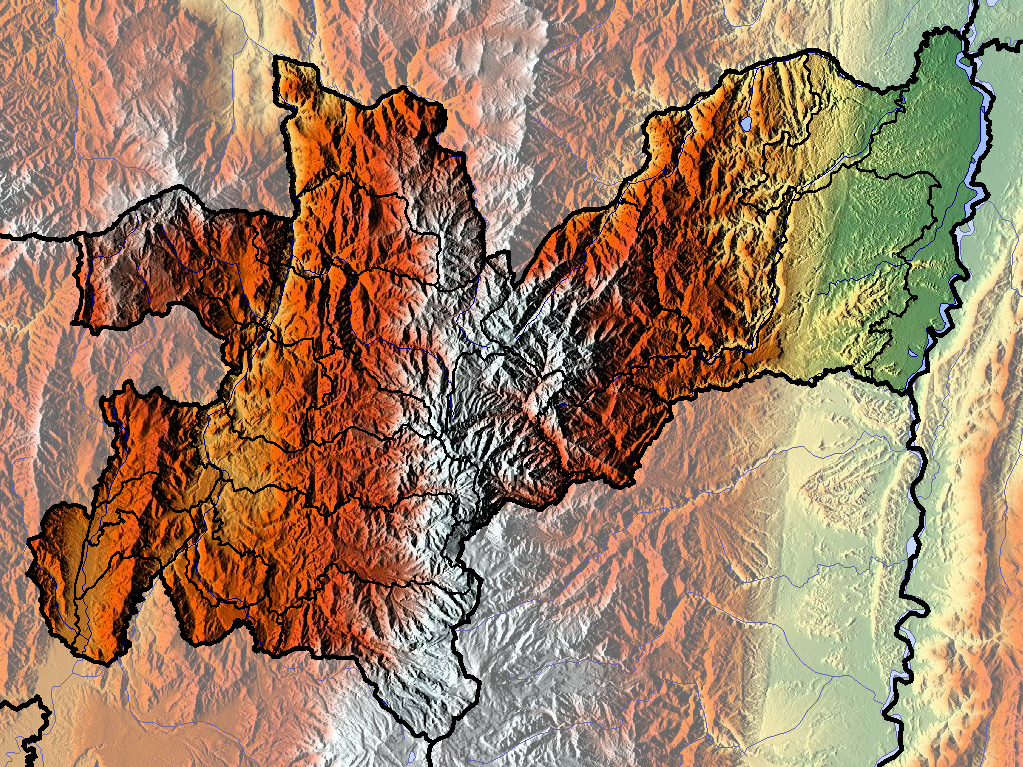
- Topography of the department
- Coordinates: 5°06′N 75°33′W
- Country: Colombia
- Region: Andean Region
- Department: 1905
- Capital: Manizales

Government
  - Governor: Henry Gutiérrez Ángel (2024–2027)

Area
  - Total: 7,888 km^{2} (3,046 sq mi)
  - Rank: 28th

Population (2018)
  - Total: 998,255
  - Rank: 17th
  - Density: 126.6/km^{2} (327.8/sq mi)

GDP
  - Total: COP 23,953 billion (US$ 5.6 billion)
- Time zone: UTC-05
- ISO 3166 code: CO-CAL
- Municipalities: 27
- HDI: 0.798 high · 7th of 33
- Website: gobernaciondecaldas.gov.co

Caldas (Spanish pronunciation: [ˈkaldas]) is a department of Colombia named after Colombian patriotic figure Francisco José de Caldas. It is part of the Paisa Region and its capital is Manizales. The population of Caldas is 998,255, and its area is 7,291 km^{2}. Caldas is also part of the Colombian Coffee-Growers Axis region along with the Risaralda and Quindio departments, which were politically separated from Caldas in 1966.

== Subdivisions ==
=== Municipalities ===
1. Aguadas
2. Anserma
3. Aranzazu
4. Belalcázar
5. Chinchiná
6. Filadelfia
7. La Dorada
8. La Merced
9. Manizales
10. Manzanares
11. Marmato
12. Marquetalia
13. Marulanda
14. Neira
15. Norcasia
16. Pácora
17. Palestina
18. Pensilvania
19. Riosucio
20. Risaralda
21. Salamina
22. Samaná
23. San José
24. Supía
25. Victoria
26. Villamaría
27. Viterbo

=== Districts ===
Caldas has 6 districts.

== Dams ==
The Miel I Dam is situated in Caldas.

== Demography ==
Historical population
Year	Pop.	±%
1938	769,968	—
1951	1,067,324	+38.6%
1964	712,916	−33.2%
1973	698,042	−2.1%
1985	883,024	+26.5%
1993	1,030,062	+16.7%
2005	968,740	−6.0%
2018	998,255	+3.0%

The population of Caldas is 984,128 (2013), half of whom live in Manizales. The racial composition is:

- White / Mestizo (93.16%)
- Amerindian or Indigenous (4.29%)
- Black or Afro-Colombian (2.54%)

The local inhabitants of Caldas are known as caldenses. Of the five main regional groups in Colombia, the predominant group in Caldas are known as paisa, referring to those living in the Paisa region, which covers most of Antioquia, as well as the departments of Caldas, Risaralda and Quindío.
